= List of Irish mobile virtual network operators =

Mobile virtual network operators (MVNOs) in Ireland lease wireless telephone and data spectrum from major carriers such as Vodafone, Eir, and Three for resale. As of Q3 2025, the market share of MVNOs in Ireland is 15.6% (excluding 48, Clear Mobile and GoMo), with Tesco Mobile having 8.1%, Lycamobile and Virgin Mobile with 2.5%, Sky Mobile with 1.7% and An Post Mobile with 0.9%.

== Active operators ==
Brand	Host network	Wireless Technology				Voice over LTE	WiFi Calling	eSIM	MVNO Type
Brand	Host network	2G	3G	4G	5G	Voice over LTE	WiFi Calling	eSIM	MVNO Type
48 (formerly 48Months)	Three	Yes	Yes	Yes	Yes (Note: Currently only available on the €12.99pm plan.)	No	No	No	PAYG
An Post Mobile(formerly Postfone)	Vodafone	Yes	Yes	Yes	No	No	No	No	PAYG
Clear Mobile	Vodafone	Yes	Yes	Yes	Yes	Yes	Yes	No	PAYM
GoMo	Eir	Yes	Yes	Yes	Yes	Yes	Yes	Yes	PAYM
Lidl Connect	Eir	Yes	Yes	Yes	Yes	Yes	Yes	Yes	PAYG
Lycamobile	Eir	Yes	Yes	Yes	Yes	No	No	Yes	PAYG
Revolut Mobile	Vodafone	Yes	Yes	Yes	Yes	Yes	Yes	Yes	PAYG
Sky Mobile	Vodafone	Yes	Yes	Yes	Yes	Yes	Yes	Yes	PAYM
Tesco Mobile	Three	Yes	Yes	Yes	Yes	No	No	No	PAYG/PAYM
Virgin Mobile	Three	Yes	Yes	Yes	No	No	No	No	PAYM

== Defunct operators ==
Brand	Host network	Defunct date	Notes
Cellular 3	Eircell		
eMobile	Meteor	September 2017	
iD Mobile	Three	March 2018	
Just Mobile	Vodafone	August 2011	
