= Hyperoptic =

British full fibre network and internet service provider

Hyperoptic Limited
- Type: Private
- Industry: Telecommunication
- Founded: 6 April 2011; 15 years ago
- Founders: Boris Ivanovic & Dana Tobak CBE
- Headquarters: London, England
- Area served: United Kingdom
- Key people: Dana Tobak; (CEO & co-founder)
- Products: Internet Services
- Revenue: ▲£114 million (2024)
- Operating income: ▲£87 million (2024)
- Net income: ▼ -£(144) million (2024)
- Total assets: ▲£527.8 million (2022)
- Owner: KKR
- Number of employees: ▼1,724 (2024)
- Website: hyperoptic.com

Hyperoptic Limited is a British telecommunications company that provides digital telephone and internet services. Founded in April 2011, it is headquartered at Kings House, London.

Hyperoptic owns and operates its own Fibre to the Premises (FTTP) network in the United Kingdom. As of December 2024, it had passed 1.8 million premises and had 373,918 connected customers.

On 2 December 2025, Hyperoptic announced that it would be changing its commercial strategy by focusing on commercial connections and by utilising Openreach’s FTTP wholesale product, which is expected to go live in early 2026. At the same time, the company announced that employees may be at risk of redundancy. The company indicated this to be around 5% of its workforce which equates to around 70 positions.

== History ==
Hyperoptic was incorporated with Companies House in the United Kingdom as Bcube Limited on 13 April 2010 by Dana Tobak, becoming known as Hyperoptic Limited on 6 April 2011. Boris Ivanovic joined Tobak as co-founder and chairman of Hyperoptic, with the pair having previously founded Be Broadband together in 2005, a business they later sold to O2 in June 2006 for £50 million.

Hyperoptic was launched in response to market demand for gigabit enabled consumer broadband, with the UK average at the time of inception being just 7Mbps – ranking the UK in 25th place for global broadband speeds. It launched on 14 September 2011, rolling out its own full fibre network to large complexes of flats in London, with plans to reach one million homes by extending its services to large UK cities and towns by the end of 2017. The company was unsuccessful in reaching its target of one million premises, having only reached half a million premises by the end of 2018. It ultimately reached the one million milestone in November 2022.

By March 2013, Hyperoptic had installed its fibre optic network in 20,000 homes in London. Two months later, in May, the company received an equity investment commitment of £50 million led by Quantum Strategic Partners, a private investment vehicle managed by Soros Fund Management. Following this, it announced its intention to expand to Bristol, Cardiff and Reading.

In August 2018, Hyperoptic announced it had raised £250 million in funding from eight banks to extend its full-fibre network to two million homes and businesses by 2022, with plans to cover 5 million premises by 2025. In November 2018, Abu Dhabi’s sovereign wealth fund, Mubadala Investment Company, acquired a minority stake in Hyperoptic. At the time of the acquisition, the company's network covered 500,000 premises across 30 UK cities.

On 14 October 2019, it was announced that investment firm KKR had bought a majority stake in Hyperoptic from funds managed by Newlight Partners LP and Mubadala Investment Company.

By November 2022, Hyperoptic had finally hit its milestone of passing one million premises - five years later than it had intended. Having only passed one million premises by the end of 2022, it pushed its target of reaching two million premises back to 2023, before again pushing it back to 2024.

In June 2023, it was announced 6% of Hyperoptic's workforce were facing redundancy, following a shift in focus from rolling out its network to connecting customers.

Hyperoptic was one of the top 5 fibre network companies in the UK by network size in March 2023, covering 1.4 million homes and servicing 300,000 customers by the end of the year.

In July 2024, a further £150m loan was secured from the UK Investment Bank (UKIB), bringing its debt facility to more than £1.1bn
