= IrelandOffline =

IrelandOffline (IOFFL) is an Irish consumer pressure group which was set up on 13 May 2001 to lobby for universal, affordable internet access in Ireland.

In early May 2001, the internet service provider Esat discontinued provision to 2000 users of its "IOL Surf No Limits" internet access package - a flat rate package - for what it deemed "excessive usage" of the service. This prompted discussions by disgruntled users on the ie.comp newsgroup, where it was decided that a pressure group was required to lobby Eircom (the former state-owned monopoly), Esat, Comreg (formerly the ODTR), and the Irish Government to take effective action that would ultimately result in universal Broadband Internet access to every home in the country.

Since its founding, IrelandOffline has changed its strategy and objectives as the market in Ireland has evolved. IrelandOffline's current objective is Affordable Internet access for all;

- Affordable—comparable with other countries for comparable services.
- Internet—functional narrowband access (that is, not at rates as low as the 14 kbit/s currently available to a substantial number of households), and proper broadband access.
- Access—accessible to every household in the country.

Ireland Offline terminated its operation in August 2007 with Ireland still ranking low in the European broadband availability and usage statistics. Some members of the IrelandOffline community reformed the group in December group in regard to the provisioning of broadband.
