= 48 Mobile =

- Formerly: 48 Months
- Type: Subsidiary
- Industry: Telecommunications
- Founded: January 2012
- Founder: O2 Ireland
- Headquarters: 28/29 Sir John Rogerson's Quay, Dublin 2, D02 EY80, Ireland
- Products: Mobile telephony
- Owner: Three Ireland
- Website: www.48.ie

48 (formerly 48 Months) is an Irish mobile telecommunications brand operated by Three Ireland. It was launched in January 2012 as a digital-only mobile service aimed primarily at people aged between 18 and 22. The brand initially operated using the O2 Ireland network before becoming part of Three following the acquisition of O2 Ireland.

48 originally targeted young adults and later expanded its availability to customers of all ages. In 2020, the service underwent a major relaunch, introducing a redesigned brand identity, new membership plans and flexible data-management features.

The service provides prepaid, SIM-only mobile subscriptions and uses Three Ireland's network infrastructure for mobile connectivity.

== History ==
=== 2012: Launch ===
48 was launched in January 2012 by Telefónica Digital, the digital division of Spanish telecommunications company Telefónica, which also owned O2 Ireland at the time. The service was introduced as a low-cost mobile network specifically targeting people between their 18th and 22nd birthdays.

The name 48 referred to the 48 months between a person's 18th and 22nd birthdays. The original service was marketed as an online-only alternative to traditional mobile phone subscriptions.

At launch, the service offered a €10 monthly package that included unlimited calls and text messages to Irish mobile networks, alongside 20 minutes of calls to landline numbers. Mobile internet access was charged separately.

The service used O2 Ireland's existing mobile network infrastructure.

=== 2013–2015: Acquisition of O2 Ireland ===
In June 2013, Three Ireland acquired O2 Ireland. The acquisition was subsequently completed, and O2 Ireland's operations were integrated into Three Ireland in March 2015.

Following the acquisition, 48 continued operating as a separate consumer-facing mobile brand under Three Ireland.

=== 2016–2019: Development ===
During the years following the acquisition, 48 continued to operate as a digital-focused mobile service in Ireland.

The brand retained its original emphasis on younger customers and online account management. Its positioning was based on providing lower-cost mobile services without the traditional retail and contract arrangements associated with larger mobile operators.

=== 2020: Major relaunch ===
In 2020, 48 underwent a major relaunch, introducing a new visual identity and a redesigned digital customer experience. The relaunch was intended to appeal to a new generation of mobile users while retaining the brand's youth-oriented identity.

The relaunched service introduced new monthly membership plans in April 2020, with plans publicly announced in June. The initial offers included a €9.99 plan with 20 GB of data and a €14.99 plan with 40 GB of data. Both included calls, text messages and an allowance for European Union and United Kingdom roaming.

The relaunch also introduced a range of data-management features known as Flexi Data. These allowed customers to manage unused data in several ways, including:

- Carrying unused data over to the following month.
- Saving data for later use.
- Sharing data with other 48 customers.
- Exchanging unused call minutes for additional data.
- Borrowing additional data.
- Donating data to charity.

The donation feature supported FoodCloud, with 48 contributing money for data donated by customers.

The relaunched service was managed through the My48 online portal and mobile application. Customer support was also provided through digital channels.

In September 2020, 48 introduced a promotional €7.99 monthly offer containing 100 GB of data, calls, texts and 10 GB of roaming data. The offer was aimed at attracting new customers to the relaunched service.

=== 2021–2022: Changes to membership plans ===
48 continued to modify its membership plans during 2021 and 2022.

In April 2022, the company introduced changes to its pricing structure. The €9.99 plan was discontinued for new customers, while existing customers on that plan were moved to a €10.99 plan offering 100 GB of domestic data.

A €12.99 plan was also introduced, offering unlimited domestic data subject to the applicable fair usage policy and a separate roaming data allowance. The plans included limits on calls and text messages.

=== 2023: Billing cycle controversy ===
In May 2023, 48 notified customers of a proposed change to its membership renewal system. The company intended to move from monthly billing to a four-week renewal cycle, with the change scheduled to take effect on 5 July 2023.

The proposal attracted complaints from customers because the company had previously advertised certain prices as being available "for life" or "forever". Moving to a four-week billing cycle would have resulted in customers paying more frequently over a year.

The Commission for Communications Regulation (ComReg) investigated the proposed change over concerns about potentially misleading commercial practices. On 11 July 2023, ComReg announced that 48 had withdrawn the proposed change and provided commitments concerning its future conduct.

The company subsequently retained the existing billing arrangements for customers covered by the commitments.

In December 2023, 48 increased the European Union roaming data allowances on its €12.99 and €10.99 plans without changing their monthly prices.

=== 2024: Introduction of 5G ===
In February 2024, 48 announced that 5G connectivity would be included in its €12.99 monthly plan at no additional charge. The change applied to both new and existing eligible customers.

Customers needed a compatible 5G-enabled device and access to Three's 5G coverage to use the service.

In August 2024, 48 removed the 200 GB fair usage limit previously applied to domestic data usage on its €12.99 plan. The plan subsequently provided unlimited domestic data in the Republic of Ireland, while retaining a separate European Union and United Kingdom roaming allowance.

=== 2025: Roaming allowance changes ===
In October 2025, 48 announced increases to the roaming data allowances included in its main membership plans.

The changes, effective from 17 November 2025, increased the roaming allowance on the €12.99 plan from 17 GB to 20 GB, the €10.99 plan from 14 GB to 17 GB, and the €7.99 plan from 10 GB to 12 GB. The monthly prices and domestic data allowances remained unchanged.

=== 2026: Current services ===
By November 2026, 48 continued to operate as a prepaid mobile brand using Three Ireland's network.

Its advertised services included unlimited domestic 5G data on its €12.99 plan and a separate 100 GB 4G plan. Both plans included allowances for calls, text messages and European roaming.

48 was also recognised at the 2026 Switcher.ie Mobile Awards, receiving the awards for Best SIM-Only Pay As You Go Plan and Best Value Mobile Network.

== Services ==
=== Mobile network ===
48 uses the mobile network infrastructure operated by Three Ireland. It is a consumer-facing brand of Three rather than an operator with its own independent nationwide radio network infrastructure.

The service provides mobile connectivity through 4G and, on eligible plans, 5G technology.

=== Mobile plans ===
48 primarily offers prepaid, SIM-only mobile subscriptions. Customers purchase a monthly plan in advance rather than entering into a conventional long-term mobile contract.

The service has offered several different plans throughout its history, with prices, data allowances and roaming limits changing over time.

As of November 2026, its advertised plans included:

- A €12.99 plan offering unlimited domestic data, including 5G, subject to the plan's terms.
- A 100 GB 4G data plan.

Both plans included 5,000 minutes and 5,000 text messages, as well as an EU and UK roaming allowance.

=== Roaming ===
48 provides roaming services in supported countries, including EU and UK destinations. Roaming data allowances are subject to the customer's chosen membership plan and the applicable fair usage policy.

=== Digital services ===
48 operates as a digital-first mobile brand. Customers can manage their subscriptions, purchase plans and access account information through the company's website and My48 services.

Customer support is provided through online channels, including its website and online community.

== Network coverage ==
48 uses Three Ireland's mobile network, meaning its coverage is based on Three's network infrastructure.

According to 48's coverage information, its network provides population coverage of approximately 99% for 4G and 90% for 5G in Ireland. Actual availability and performance depend on the customer's location, device and local network conditions.

== Awards and recognition ==
48 has received recognition in the Irish mobile telecommunications market.

In the 2026 Switcher.ie Mobile Awards, the brand received the following awards:

- Best SIM-Only Pay As You Go Plan.
- Best Value Mobile Network.

== See also ==
- Three Ireland
- Telecommunications in the Republic of Ireland
- Mobile virtual network operator
