= Internet censorship in the Republic of Ireland =

Internet censorship in Ireland is a controversial issue with the introduction of a graduated response policy in 2008 followed by an effort to block certain file sharing sites starting in February 2009. Beyond these issues there are no government restrictions on access to the Internet or credible reports that the government monitored e-mail or Internet chat rooms. Individuals and groups could engage in the expression of views via the Internet, including by e-mail. Irish law provides for freedom of speech including for members of the press, and the government generally respects these rights in practice. An independent press, an effective judiciary, and a functioning democratic political system act jointly to ensure freedom of speech and of the press.

== History ==
In 1999, Connect.ie, a Dublin-based Internet service provider, was subjected to a denial of service attack by hackers believed to be acting at the behest and with support from a faction of the Indonesian military. At the time Connect.ie was hosting the .tp top-level domain on behalf of people in East Timor during the Indonesian occupation of East Timor, the top-level domain was temporarily disabled during the attack.

In 2006 the Irish domain registry IEDR was criticised for maintaining a domain name blacklist including common words like porn.

== Graduated response ==
A graduated response policy is currently being encouraged by the Irish Recorded Music Association who are urging ISPs in Ireland to send warning letters and blocking content which it believes is damaging the music industry. According to a report published by solicitors McCann Fitzgerald this is the first implementation in Europe of the three strikes system that record companies are lobbying to bring on throughout:

1. Once notified of the IP addresses, Eircom will first inform the broadband subscriber that their IP address has been used in connection with illegal activities. At this stage, subscribers who claim they are the victim of "Wi-Fi hijacking" (where someone else uses their Wi-Fi network to access the Internet) will have the opportunity to clarify their situation and upgrade the security of their connection if required.
2. If a subscriber is then found to still be infringing, they will be warned that failure to cease infringing activities will result in their being disconnected by Eircom.
3. Continued failure to comply and cease infringing activity will result in the subscriber being disconnected.

== Blocking access to file sharing sites ==
IRMA who represent EMI, Sony Music Entertainment, Warner Bros. and Universal are seeking that Eircom along with all other major Irish ISPs block access to file sharing sites such as The Pirate Bay and Mininova.

In contrast to similar drives in countries including Australia this is being driven entirely by commercial rather than political interests such as child safety.

According to the Internet Service Providers Association of Ireland:

"Internet Service Providers in Ireland have recently received letters threatening legal action from solicitors representing four major music recording companies. This legal action is spurious and there is no evidence of wrong-doing by Internet Service Providers. These actions could impact on user privacy, damage the development of new internet services, and hurt Ireland's standing as an eCommerce hub."

Letters explaining the plans were delivered to Irish ISPs including Blacknight and Eircom on 13 February 2009, calling for them to participate in the block or face possible legal action.

Eircom have announced they will implement the block on The Pirate Bay from 1 September 2009. Other ISPs, including UPC Ireland and BT Ireland are resisting pressure from IRMA.

Grassroots campaigns including "Blackout Ireland" and "Boycott Eircom" have been established to protest the censorship.

== Talks on blocking Internet access ==
In April 2010, the Irish government was revealed to have held discussions to introduce Internet filtering. Documents obtained under Freedom of information legislation by Digital Rights Ireland mention a meeting between the Department of Justice and Law Reform and Vodafone, an email from Hutchison 3G listing filtering technologies it uses, and a meeting between the Office of Internet Safety and the Garda Síochána on the proposed introduction of Internet blocking. In July 2013 the ISP Association of Ireland issued a press statement stating ISP's "should not be made censors" in response to renewed calls for blocking and filtering by Irish ISPs.

== See also ==
- Censorship in Ireland
- Digital Rights Ireland
- Freedom of speech in Ireland
- Ireland Offline
- Irish Internet Hotline, illegal Internet content reporting service
- Streisand Effect
