= Tesco Mobile =

British mobile virtual network operator

Tesco Mobile Limited
- Logo used since 14 August 2019
- Formerly: Tesco Mobile Communications Limited (June–August 2003)
- Type: Joint venture
- Industry: Telecommunications
- Founded: 29 May 2003; 23 years ago in Cheshunt, Hertfordshire, England
- Headquarters: Welwyn Garden City, England
- Area served: United Kingdom, Ireland, Slovakia, Czech Republic
- Key people: Jonathan Taylor (CEO); Mark Bowden (CFO)
- Products: Mobile telecommunications
- Owner: Tesco (50%); O2 UK (50%)
- Website: tescomobile.com

Tesco Mobile Limited is a mobile virtual network operator (MVNO) in the United Kingdom, Ireland, Slovakia, and the Czech Republic. It is operated by British retailer Tesco, using the network O2 as its carrier except in Ireland, where the network operator is Three Ireland.

== Overview ==
Tesco Mobile was established in May 2003 and launched pre-paid mobile services in Tesco stores and online by the end of the year. In January 2014, the network in the United Kingdom started offering 4G service, for its pay monthly and SIM only customers at no extra cost, extending the service to pay as you go customers in July of that year.

As of December 2017, the company was a 50:50 joint venture between Tesco (through its subsidiaries Tesco Mobile Communications Limited and Tesco Mobile Services Limited) and O2 UK.

In 2023, Tesco Mobile was serving 5 million mobile customers and was the biggest virtual mobile network in the UK.

In January 2024, Tesco Mobile and Virgin Media O2 signed a ten-year renewal of their agreement.

== Outside the United Kingdom ==
=== Ireland ===
In December 2006, Tesco Ireland announced that it would enter into a joint venture with O_{2} Ireland to offer mobile telecommunications services. The service, which was Ireland's second MVNO (the defunct Cellular 3 having been the first), used the O_{2} network but operates separately. It has been allocated the area code 089. As with Tesco's mobile service of the United Kingdom, it is branded Tesco Mobile. The network commenced operation in 2007. Tesco Mobile had 375,000 customers in Ireland as of August 2017.

In March 2015, after it was announced that Three had purchased O2's Irish operations, it was announced that the O2 Ireland network would close and that the O2 website, shops and network would merge into Three Ireland. As a result, Tesco Mobile Ireland moved from the O2 network to the Three network. Since August 2018, Tesco Mobile customers can access Three masts, which means that they can now avail of 4G as well as increased 3G coverage.

=== Slovakia ===
In December 2009, Tesco Stores SR announced that it would enter into a joint venture with Telefónica Slovakia to offer mobile telecommunications services. The service, which is Slovakia's second MVNO (the naymobile having been the first), uses the O_{2} network but operates separately.

=== Czech Republic ===
In May 2013, Tesco Stores ČR a.s. announced that it would enter into a joint venture with Telefónica Czech Republic to offer mobile telecommunications services. The service uses the O_{2} network.

=== Discontinued operations ===
Tesco Mobile Hungary was a 50:50 joint venture, providing Tesco Mobile branded services in Hungary through Tesco stores and online, using Vodafone's technology and network. Services were ended in April 2016, and the service was taken over by Vodafone.
