= O2 (brand) =

Global brand name owned by Telefónica

- Product type: Telecommunications
- Current owner: Telefónica
- Country: United Kingdom
- Introduced: 2002; 24 years ago
- Discontinued: Czech Republic; Ireland; Slovakia
- Related brands: Movistar; Vivo
- Markets: United Kingdom; Germany; Spain
- Previous owners: British Telecom
- Website: telefonica.com

O2 (typeset as O_{2}) is a British brand owned by Spanish telecommunications company Telefónica, used for its subsidiaries in the United Kingdom and Germany, its former subsidiaries in the Czech Republic and Slovakia, and since 2018 as an online-only flanker brand in Spain. The O2 brand was created by British Telecom (BT) in 2001 ahead of the demerger of its global BT Wireless division as mmO2 plc (later O2 plc).

BT Wireless provided telecommunications services in the United Kingdom (BT Cellnet), Ireland (Digifone), Germany (VIAG Interkom), the Netherlands (Telfort), the Isle of Man (Manx Telecom), and a global mobile data business known as Genie Internet. Most of these operations were rebranded as O2 following the demerger from BT. In 2006, O2 plc was acquired by Telefónica, becoming Telefónica Europe. As part of a reorganisation of Telefónica in 2014, Telefónica Europe's holdings and operations became direct subsidiaries of its parent: Telefónica S.A.

Today, the O2 brand is used primarily in the United Kingdom, Germany, the Czech Republic, Slovakia, and Spain. In the United Kingdom, O2 is the largest mobile network by customer base, and since 2021 has formed part of Virgin Media O2—a 50:50 joint venture between Telefónica and Liberty Global. It has held the naming rights to the O2 Arena in London since 2007, a partnership with Live Nation covering branding and priority access to customers for the Academy Music Group venues since 2008, and been long-time sponsors of England Rugby (since it was BT Cellnet). In Germany, O2 functions as Telefónica's flagship brand, offering broadband, landline, and mobile services. The O2 Czech Republic and Slovakia networks were acquired by Telefónica in 2005 and branded O2. These businesses were sold by Telefónica in 2013, but continue to license the brand. In Spain, O2 is an online-only flanker brand of Telefónica subsidiary Movistar.

== History ==
=== 1985–2001: BT Wireless era ===
==== United Kingdom ====
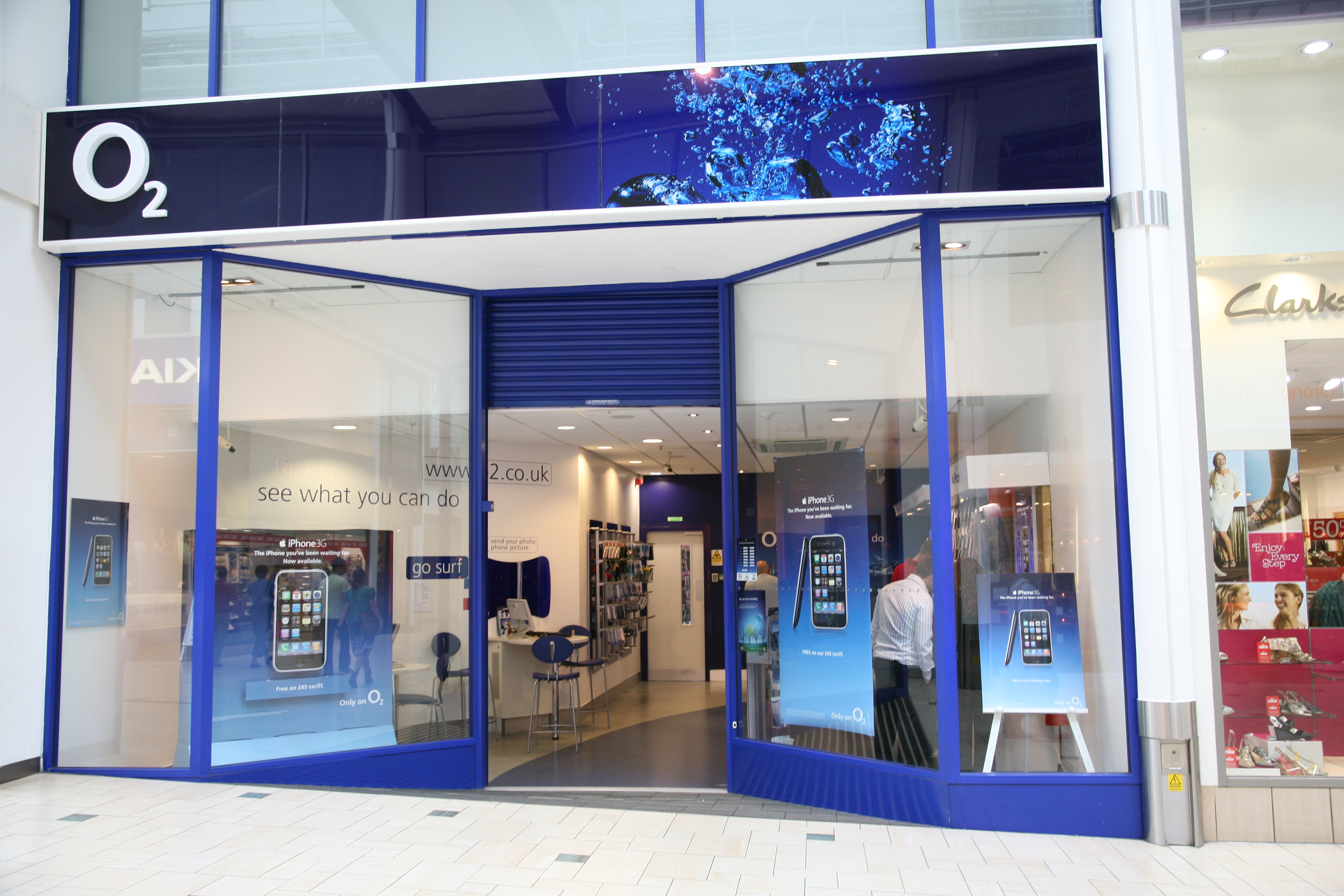
O2 store in Banbury, England

Cellnet was launched in January 1985 as a subsidiary of Telecom Securicor Cellular Radio Limited, a 60:40 venture between British Telecommunications (British Telecom or BT) and Securicor respectively.

In 1999, BT purchased Securicor's shares in Cellnet for £3.15 billion. The company was later rebranded as BT Cellnet, and it became a part of BT Wireless, a group of subsidiary companies owned by BT. BT invested £2 billion in BT Cellnet, and in 2000, BT Cellnet had over 6 million customers.

In October 2001, at a general meeting held in Birmingham, 4.297 billion BT shares voted in favour of BT Cellnet's demerger from BT, with 0.67 million shares voting against. In 2001, BT Cellnet demerged from BT as mmO2 plc, and was relaunched on 1 May 2002 using the O2 brand. The company changed its name from mmO2 to O2 plc in March 2005. In 2021 it merged with Virgin Media to form Virgin Media O2.

==== Republic of Ireland ====
Digifone was created in 2000, as the demerged mobile business of the prior Esat Digifone which had just been purchased by BT. Esat Digifone was originally a joint venture between Esat Telecom and Telenor. After the acquisition of Esat Telecom by BT, the Telenor share in Esat Digifone was also acquired by BT. Subsequently, the fixed operations, Esat Telecom later became BT Ireland and the demerged mobile operations, rebranded without the Esat name as Digifone, became a part of the newly formed separate company, mmO2 plc. Digifone became O2 Ireland in 2002 as a subsidiary of mmO2 plc following the demerger from BT. O2 Ireland became a subsidiary of Telefónica in 2006, after its parent company O2 in the United Kingdom was purchased. In June 2013, Hutchison Whampoa announced it would acquire the Republic of Ireland arm of O2 for €780m. O2 was merged into Hutchison Whampoa's subsidiary Three Ireland in March 2015.

==== Germany ====
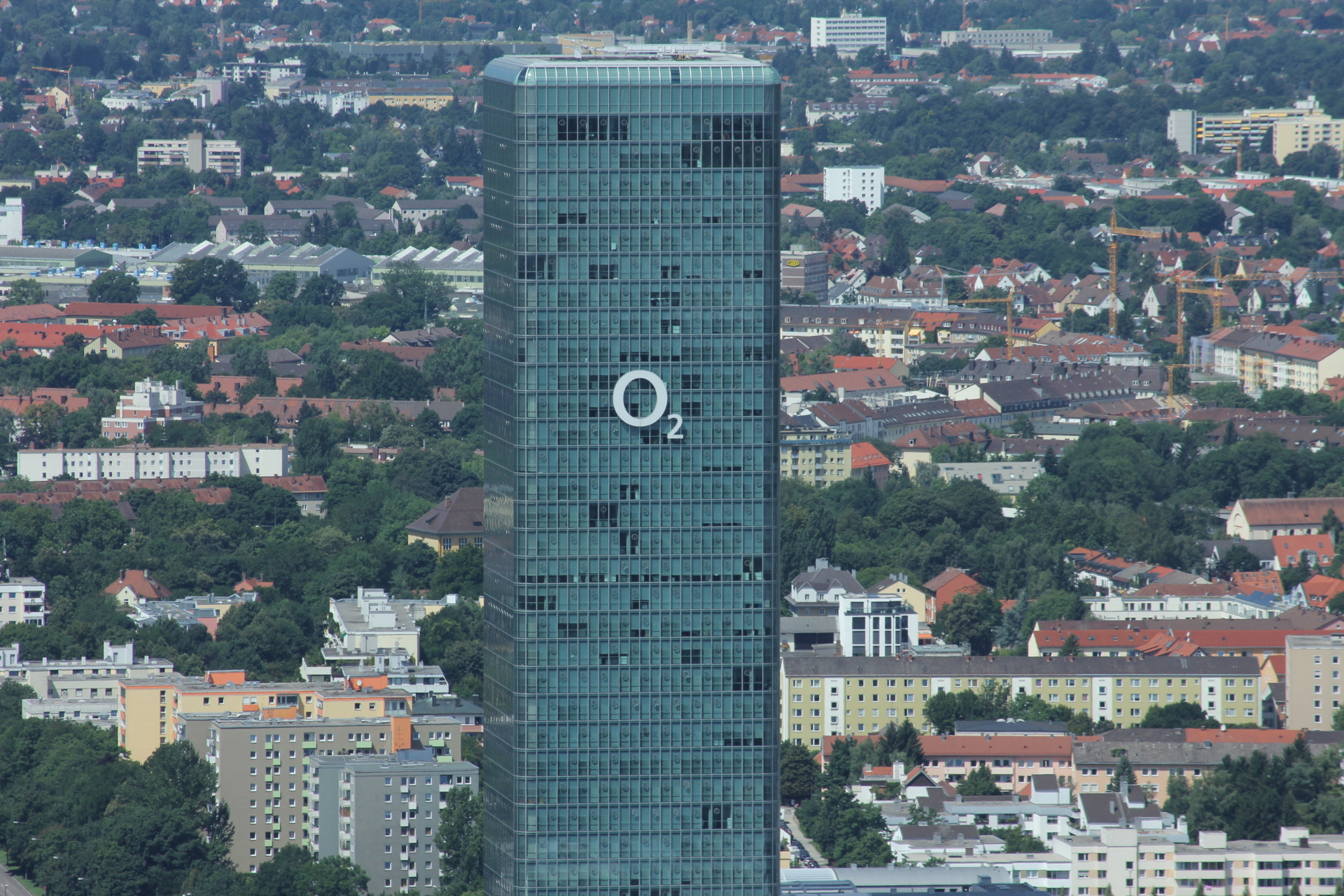
Telefónica Germany headquarters in Munich

Viag Interkom was created in 1995 as a joint venture of the German power supply firm VIAG (45%), British BT Group (then called British Telecommunications) (45%) and Norwegian Telenor (10%) in order to compete for official licence to provide services in the rapidly liberalising German (fixed and mobile) telecommunications market at that time. In 2001 BT acquired VIAG's share (owned by German energy company E.ON) for €11.4 billion following the German UMTS licence auction the previous year. Viag Interkom's mobile operations were transferred into the BT Wireless family and the fixed business became BT (Germany) GmbH & CO. Viag Interkom became O2 Germany as a subsidiary of mmO2 plc in 2001, following the demerger from BT.

==== The Netherlands ====
Telfort was created in March 1997 as a 50:50 joint venture between BT and Nederlandse Spoorwegen (the Dutch national railways operator) and headquartered in Amsterdam. Telfort was awarded a licence by the government of the Netherlands to provide fixed telecommunications services in November of that year, and a mobile licence was awarded the following year. In 2000, the mobile operations of Telfort became a part of the BT Wireless family. Telfort became O2 Netherlands as a subsidiary of mmO2 plc in 2001, following the demerger from BT.

In 2003, O2 sold the company to Greenfield Capital Partners which reverted the company back to the Telfort name. Telfort eventually became a wholly owned subsidiary of KPN.

==== Isle of Man ====
Manx Telecom was demerged from BT as part of the mmO2 flotation in 2001. Unlike some of the company's counterparts, the fixed and mobile arms of Manx Telecom were not split prior to the demerger, which meant that Manx Telecom was the mmO2 group's only fixed operation at the time.

After the demerger from BT in 2001, Manx Telecom continued to trade under its brand as a subsidiary of mmO2 plc.

On 4 June 2010, Manx Telecom was sold to UK private equity investor HG Capital (who were buying the majority stake), alongside telecoms management company CPS Partners. HG Capital indicated that the enterprise value of the deal was £158.8 million ($232.5 million).

==== Genie Internet and Genie Asia ====
Genie Internet logo

Genie Internet Ltd and Genie Asia were created as autonomous but wholly owned subsidiaries of BT in 2000. By the time it became a part of the BT Wireless family of companies in 2001, Genie had mobile portal operations in the UK, Germany, Spain, Italy, the Netherlands, Hong Kong and Japan, and an Internet MVNO operation in the UK called Genie Mobile. Prior to the demerger of O2 from BT, Genie scaled back its global operations in order to align with the mobile businesses demerging with it; namely UK, Germany, Ireland and the Netherlands. The Genie Asia business continued portal operations in Asia.

After demerging from BT in 2001, the European Genie business became the basis of a central products and services division called 'Products O2' and the Genie Mobile business was rebranded to 'O2 Online' which continues in the UK as a mobile communications service provider tied to the O2 UK network. The Genie portal properties were rebranded O2 Active in UK, Germany, Ireland and the Netherlands, and Genie Asia became O2 Asia. O2 Asia became a subsidiary of O2 UK for governance purposes.

=== 2001–2005: mmO2 plc era ===
Following the demerger of British Telecommunications plc in 2001, mmO2 plc was created as the holding company for BT's former mobile network assets and was split from the rest of the company, now named BT Group plc. During this period, O2 Netherlands was sold to Dutch investment group Greenfield Capital Partners in 2003. mmO2 plc was later renamed O2 plc before being taken over by Telefónica.

=== 2006–present: Telefónica subsidiary ===
On 31 October 2005, O2 plc agreed to be taken over by Telefónica, a Spanish telecommunications company, with a cash offer of £17.7 billion, or £2 per share. According to the merger announcement, O2 retained its name and continued to be based in the United Kingdom, keeping both the brand and the management team. The merger became unconditional on 23 January 2006.

Following the completion of the acquisition in February 2006, Telefónica undertook a corporate organisational change that saw the merging of its fixed and mobile businesses in Spain, and the transfer of Telefónica's non-Spanish European telecommunications properties into the O2 brand. Thus, the Český Telecom and Eurotel operations in the Czech Republic as well as the Telefónica Deutschland business in Germany were brought into the governance of O2, which retained its UK registered public company status with its own board of directors and corporate governance structures and processes.

Telefónica chose to keep their existing mobile phone operations in the rest of the world under the brand Movistar. This name is used in Spain and in most Latin America countries, operated by a separate management team.

Telefónica sold its O2 Asia subsidiary in a management buyout in 2007. O2 Asia, headquartered in Singapore, operating in Far East, South Asia, Middle East, and Australasian countries, for a short time developed and marketed a range of wirelessly connected PDA and smartphone products branded Xda for both the Asian and European markets, and further such products under the "MWg" brand, short for Mobile & Wireless Group.

In 2015 there were talks for Li Ka-shing, owner of the rival UK network Three, to buy the company. The following year, the European Commission blocked the takeover.

== Operations ==
Map of countries where the O2 brand is used as of 2025 Used by Telefónica Used by PPF under licence Formerly used by Telefónica

Telefónica operates its businesses under the O2 brand through its subsidiaries Telefónica UK and Telefónica Germany. Telefónica Spain uses Movistar as its flagship brand, while O2 remains one of the main network operators in the UK, providing infrastructure along with EE, 3 and Vodafone.

Area	2G licences	3G licences	4G licences	DSL
United Kingdom	GSM; GPRS; EDGE 900/1800	UMTS 900/2100; HSDPA; HSUPA; HSPA+; DC-HSPA+	LTE 800/1800/2100/2300	
Germany	GSM; GPRS; EDGE 900/1800	UMTS 900/2100; HSDPA; HSUPA; HSPA+; DC-HSPA+	LTE 700/800/900/1800/2100/2600	ADSL; ADSL2+; VDSL

Telefónica owns the Giffgaff MVNO in the United Kingdom, which uses the O2 network.

In May 2020, it was reported that Telefónica and Liberty Global plan to merge the UK operations of O2 with Virgin Media, a pay-TV and broadband provider in that country, owned by Liberty Global.

== Former operations ==
=== Ireland ===
Telefónica Ireland was providing broadband and telecommunications in Ireland under the O2 brand. O2 Ireland was previously called Esat Digifone when it was owned by Esat Telecommunications (and Telenor) from 1997 to 2006. O2 Ireland became part of Telefónica in 2006 as part of its purchase of O2 in the UK.

In June 2013, Hutchison Whampoa announced it would acquire the Irish arm of O2 for €780m. In March 2015, the company was merged into Hutchison Whampoa's subsidiary Three Ireland.

=== Czech Republic ===
Český Telecom was the new name given to a company previously known as SPT Telecom which was formed from the splitting off of the Czech Ministry of Posts and Telecommunications into postal and telecom sides in 1993. The company was renamed to Český Telecom in 2000 and remained a government-controlled company until its complete privatisation in 2004. Along the way, rapid modernisation of the network occurred with the help of funding and expertise of the Dutch and Swiss consortium called TelSource.

In parallel to the evolution of Český Telecom, the Eurotel mobile phone business was established in 1990 in a joint venture between what was then known as the Czechoslovak telecom ministry, Bell Atlantic and US West. In 1996, GSM services were introduced, and in 2003 Český Telecom acquired full control of Eurotel.

The Czech Republic government sold its remaining stake in Český Telecom (along with its Eurotel subsidiary) to Telefónica in 2005 which renamed it to Telefónica O2 Czech Republic and since 2006 started to use the O2 brand for both fixed and mobile services. In 2011 company was renamed to Telefónica Czech Republic.

In 2013 was announced that Telefónica would sell its stake in the company to PPF. Under the terms of the sale, the company would continue to use the O2 brand for a maximum of four years. The agreement was later extended, and the company continues under the O2 brand as of January 2024.

=== Slovakia ===
In 2002 Český Telecom founded Czech Telecom Slovakia, its subsidiary in Slovakia. The company was providing services for large corporations only. In 2006 the company was renamed Telefónica O2 Slovakia and won a tender for the 3rd mobile phone operator in Slovakia. On 2 February 2007, Telefónica O2 Slovakia started providing services in Slovakia for first customers "O2 Jednotky". On 28 February O2 launched classic services and opened first shop in Slovakia (in Bratislava on Obchodná street). In 2013 it was announced that it would be sold with its parent company to PPF.

== Marketing ==
=== Branding ===
The BT Cellnet consumer brand was renamed O2 – the chemical symbol for unbound oxygen – as were all the group's other businesses (other than Manx Telecom). The re-branding was designed by the Lambie-Nairn design agency, which developed the idea of the company supplying services that were essential, much the same as oxygen is essential for life. With this, the company logo and associated graphics were designed, using air bubbles to present this.

=== Sponsorship ===
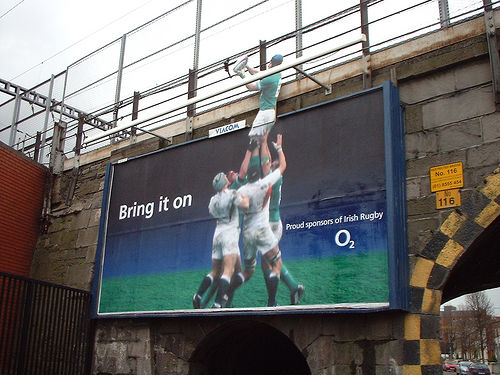
An O2 Irish rugby union advertisement

O2 currently sponsor the England rugby team, and in 2003 launched a mobile video service allowing customers to download or stream video content related to the 2003 Rugby World Cup. In 2005, Telefónica O2 extended their involvement in rugby union, signing a new deal with the England rugby team and the Rugby Football Union, as well as O2 rugbyclass and Premier Rugby Ltd for the English Premiership.

Telefónica O2 also had a long-standing relationship with Arsenal F.C., being their shirt sponsor from 2002 to 2006. In 2005, a three-year deal was signed that saw Telefónica O2 become the team's exclusive Mobile Communications Partner.

From 2005 to 2008, O2 sponsored the Wireless Festival, a music festival held annually in London (and near Leeds in 2006 and 2007).

Telefónica O2 was the sponsor of the Cork GAA Football and Hurling teams and the Irish rugby team. The partnership with Irish rugby went interactive in 2006, when Ireland fans were offered access to daily updates from head coach Eddie O'Sullivan. In 2009, O2 launched their 'BeTheDifference' integrated advertising campaign where fans had the chance to have their names included on the O2 Rugby posters and on the Irish Rugby players' jerseys. The integrated campaign was created by O2's two Irish advertising agencies: McConnells (above-the-line) and Brando (below-the-line). The interactive campaign won an award at the 2009 Kinsale Sharks.

=== Naming rights ===
On 31 May 2005, Telefónica O2 acquired the naming rights for the redeveloped Millennium Dome in London from Anschutz Entertainment Group (AEG). The Dome is therefore now officially known as 'The O2'. The company extended their relationship with music venues in 2008 when all Academy Music venues became known as 'O2 Academies', replacing Carling as venue sponsors.

For short time, the naming rights arrangements with AEG also apply in Germany, with large sport and concert venues known as O2 World in Berlin and Hamburg.

== See also ==
- O2 Airwave
