= Ireland On-Line =

Former internet service provider (ISP) in Ireland

Ireland On-Line (IOL) is a former ISP in Ireland.

Ireland On-line was the first commercial internet service provider in the state. The company was formed in 1992 by Barry Flanagan, and was reported to have launched "Ireland's first mass-market Internet service" in January 1994. In 1997, the company was bought by An Post for IR£2.5m. Two years later, it was sold to Esat Telecom Group plc for IR£ 115m. A year later, Esat Telecom was taken over by BT Group plc. In 2002 Esat was rebranded Esat BT. In 2009 BT Ireland withdrew from retail telecommunications and transferred retail operations, along with IOL's former subscribers, to Vodafone Ireland.
