= Be Un Limited =

Internet service provider in the UK

Sky Home Communications Limited
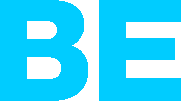
- Type: ISP
- Industry: Internet & Communications
- Founded: 2005
- Defunct: 2013 (rebrand to Sky Home Communications Limited)
- Fate: Bought by BSkyB with all customers transferred to Sky Broadband
- Headquarters: London, England, UK
- Key people: Carolyn Hewitt, Daniel Cunliffe, Louise Kirlew
- Products: Broadband
- Owner: British Sky Broadcasting
- Website: bethere.co.uk at the Wayback Machine (archived 2013-01-17)

Be Unlimited (also traded as Be There or simply BE and latterly known legally as Sky Home Communications Limited) was an Internet service provider in the United Kingdom between 2004 and 2014. Initially founded as an independent company by Boris Ivanovic and Dana Tobak in 2005, it was bought by Spanish group Telefónica Europe in 2006 before being sold on to BSkyB in March 2013 in an agreement which saw BSkyB buy the fixed telephone line and broadband business of Telefónica Europe which at the time traded under the O2 and BE brands. The deal saw BSkyB agree to pay £180 million initially, followed by a further £20 million after all customers had been transferred to Sky's existing business. The sale was subject to regulatory approval in April 2013, and was subsequently approved by the Office of Fair Trading on 16 May 2013.

BE offered ADSL2+ broadband services through BT's telephone exchanges via Local Loop Unbundling (LLU), with advertised speeds of up to 16 Mbit/s downstream and 1.9 Mbit/s upstream, subject to Annex M enablement, line length and quality, making BE's network the fastest mainstream, and first ADSL2+ ISP in Britain during its nine-year existence. Although BE's services were initially only available in selected parts of London, Manchester and Birmingham, it underwent a programme of rapid expansion across the UK making it available in at least 1,256 of the UK's telephone exchanges by 2012.

== Services and fair-use policy ==
All three levels of non-bonded ADSL service came provided with a leased "BE Box", a branded Technicolor (formerly Thomson) SpeedTouch router. Internet access was unlimited and offered uncapped bandwidth usage subject to compliance with one of the industry's more lenient Fair Usage policies. Uncapped services are currently quite unusual from UK-based ISPs due to the high cost of backhaul over BT's core backhaul network (BE used an independent Level3/GlobalCrossing backhaul, peering primarily at LINX). BE did not stipulate monthly bandwidth usage restrictions in its small print, however it was known to take action against a number of users due to dramatically excessive usage where other customers' access was affected. Such action was reported to include disconnecting customers on congested exchange who consumed over one terabyte of data in a month. This was in line with its policy which stated that it would take action against users whose usage is '...so excessive that other members are detrimentally affected' at its discretion.

To receive BE broadband, customers were required to have an active and compatible telephone lines provided by either BE, a service which it offered from 2010, or BT Wholesale reseller such as BT or the Post Office's Home Phone service. Fully unbundled telephone lines from companies such as TalkTalk or Sky were not compatible.

The majority of users who were 500 metres or less from their local telephone exchanges were expected to achieve connection speeds close to the advertised maximum; with Annex M and interleaving disabled ('fastpath') on a 300-metre loop length, a sync speed of 24 Mbit/s downstream and 2.5 Mbit/s upstream was easily achievable.

== Platform and technical information ==
BE's service utilised ADSL2+ (ITU G.992.5) and was one of the few UK ISPs to offer the Annex M extension to increase upload speeds anywhere up to the full technical maximum of ~2 Mbit/s for its BE Pro customers. The end user's router communicated with the telephone exchange using Ethernet over ATM (ETHoA, RFC 1483).

One of BE's advertised claims was that it did not carry out traffic shaping in any way and that traffic was only limited by available bandwidth and by any congestion at the local exchange. BE did, however, block SMTP traffic over port 25 to and from external destinations for users with dynamic IP addresses in order to prevent its dynamic IP pool being blacklisted. The result was that a user with a dynamic IP address could only use BE's own SMTP server or one configured to use non-standard ports for sending email. Users who wished to host their own mail server were required to subscribe to a service with a static IP address.

On 15 October 2007 O2, also owned by parent company Telefónica Europe, launched its own broadband product delivered over the BE network infrastructure. In effect, this resulted in two broadband companies delivering services over a platform on which previously only one company was operating. This, coupled with the fact that there were officially over three times the number of subscribers using the platform since the launch of O2Broadband, caused some BE users to voice concerns over the future performance, stability and contention of the service. Such concerns were generally groundless as BE upgraded its network capacity to accommodate new customers.

=== Wholesale Network Access ===
In addition to the BE and O2 brands being delivered over the same network, since 10 March 2008, BE/O2 resold wholesale access to its network to other providers. The first of these companies was Vaioni, which launched an "up to 20 Mbit/s business class ADSL2+ service" featuring up to 2.5 Mbit/s upstream and a guaranteed 10:1 contention ratio with prices starting from £140.99 per month. Vaioni's product, branded 'Ultra 20', was aimed at small to medium-sized businesses and schools.

In August 2009 the UK ISP Andrews & Arnold entered into an agreement to use BE's core and LLU networks to augment BT's legacy 20CN and 21CN infrastructure. By the time that BE was sold to BSkyB in 2013 many other business connectivity providers offered BE wholesale services.

=== Network Upgrades ===
On 6 October 2011, BE announced an overhaul of its core network to increase bandwidth, prepare for a transition to IPv6 and improve network resiliency. During this time customers with static and dynamic IP addresses were assigned new addresses; BE took the approach of rebuilding its entire network, migrating customers, changing IP address blocks and incurring a small one-off period of downtime during an end user's migration. This migration was implemented in phases with a transitional period with both old and new network settings operating concurrently.

BE also changed its methods of assigning static IP addresses, selling netblocks of one, six and fourteen as opposed to the old system of a group of addresses from a pool of arbitrarily available IPs. Customers were planned to be migrated over a six to eight months period.

== FTTC ==
In late June 2011, BE's managing director Chris Stening announced a fibre optic service to directly compete with BT Infinity. This service would also utilise FTTC technology, one of the new generation Fibre to the X technologies, with speeds and pricing yet to be determined. BE updated customers on their progress in September 2011; but whilst receiving 'thousands' of pre-registrations, as of late 2011 they had yet to partner with a suitable company operating a national fibre network to allow them to offer the level of service desired.

On 8 November 2011, BE customers who pre-registered for fibre received an email informing them of a single-exchange trial. BE would install its own equipment in BT's Barking exchange, as there were sufficient BE users in the area and FTTC was readily available via Openreach. A shortlist of 25 people was to be gathered, from which an initial 10 testers would be secured. They would then submit regular feedback over a period of up to six months, sharing their experiences publicly via the BE Blog. The new service was specified as using Openreach GEA (Generic Ethernet Access), allowing data from BT to be transferred to BE's DSLAM equipment instead of routing it to a Point of Presence (PoP) via BT's core network.

By the end of 2012, only staff and a small number of customers on a single exchange had participated in limited trials and in April 2012 BE announced that it was unlikely to launch a fibre product in 2012 but hoped to do so on a limited basis at an unspecified future date.

== Closure ==
After the sale of BE to BSkyB in March 2013, BSkyB announced that the BE and O2 networks were to close and that customers would be migrated to the existing Sky Broadband service. This resulted in the closure of BE's email and website hosting services, the discontinuation of line bonding, multiple static IPs and Annex M as well as the closure of the BE/O2 Wholesale network. Users were also gifted their existing loaned Be-Boxes. Many users however had concerns with becoming Sky customers and decided to leave rather than migrate. To try and accommodate some of their concerns Sky worked to integrate both static IP addresses and control over line profiles into their own network and launched this new service as 'Sky Broadband Unlimited Pro'.

== See also ==
- Telefónica
- Telefónica Europe
- BSkyB
