= O2 (UK) =

British telecommunications provider

Telefonica UK Limited
- Trade name: O2 (2002–present); BT Cellnet (1999–2002); Cellnet (1985–1999)
- Formerly: Telecom Securicor Cellular Radio Limited (1983–2000); BT Cellnet Limited (2000–2002); O2 (UK) Limited (2002–2008); Telefónica O2 UK Limited (2008–2011); Telefonica O2 UK Limited (2011)
- Type: Subsidiary
- Industry: Telecommunications
- Founded: 28 July 1983; 43 years ago
- Founder: John Carrington
- Headquarters: Reading, Berkshire, England, UK
- Area served: United Kingdom
- Key people: Lutz Schüler (CEO)
- Revenue: ▲£6.510 billion (2017)
- Parent: Virgin Media O2
- Subsidiaries: giffgaff; Tesco Mobile (50%)
- Website: o2.co.uk

Telefonica UK Limited, trading as O2 UK (stylised as O_{2}), is a British telecommunications services provider. It is the second largest mobile network in the United Kingdom behind VodafoneThree, with approximately 22.4 million subscribers as of December 2025. The name derives from the oxygen molecule.

In 2021, O2 UK formed a subsidiary called Virgin Media O2, a 50:50 joint venture between Telefónica and Liberty Global, through the merger of their respective O2 UK and Virgin Media businesses.

The network was launched in 1985 as Cellnet, a joint venture between British Telecom (60%) and Securicor (40%), and later rebranded BT Cellnet following BT's acquisition of Securicor's share. Cellnet was one of the two original cellular network operators in the UK, alongside Vodafone. In 2001, BT spun off its BT Wireless division as mmO2 plc (later O2 plc), with the UK network adopting the O2 brand in 2002. O2 plc was acquired by Spanish telecommunications firm Telefónica in 2006.

== History ==
=== Overview ===
BT Cellnet logo from 1999 to 2002

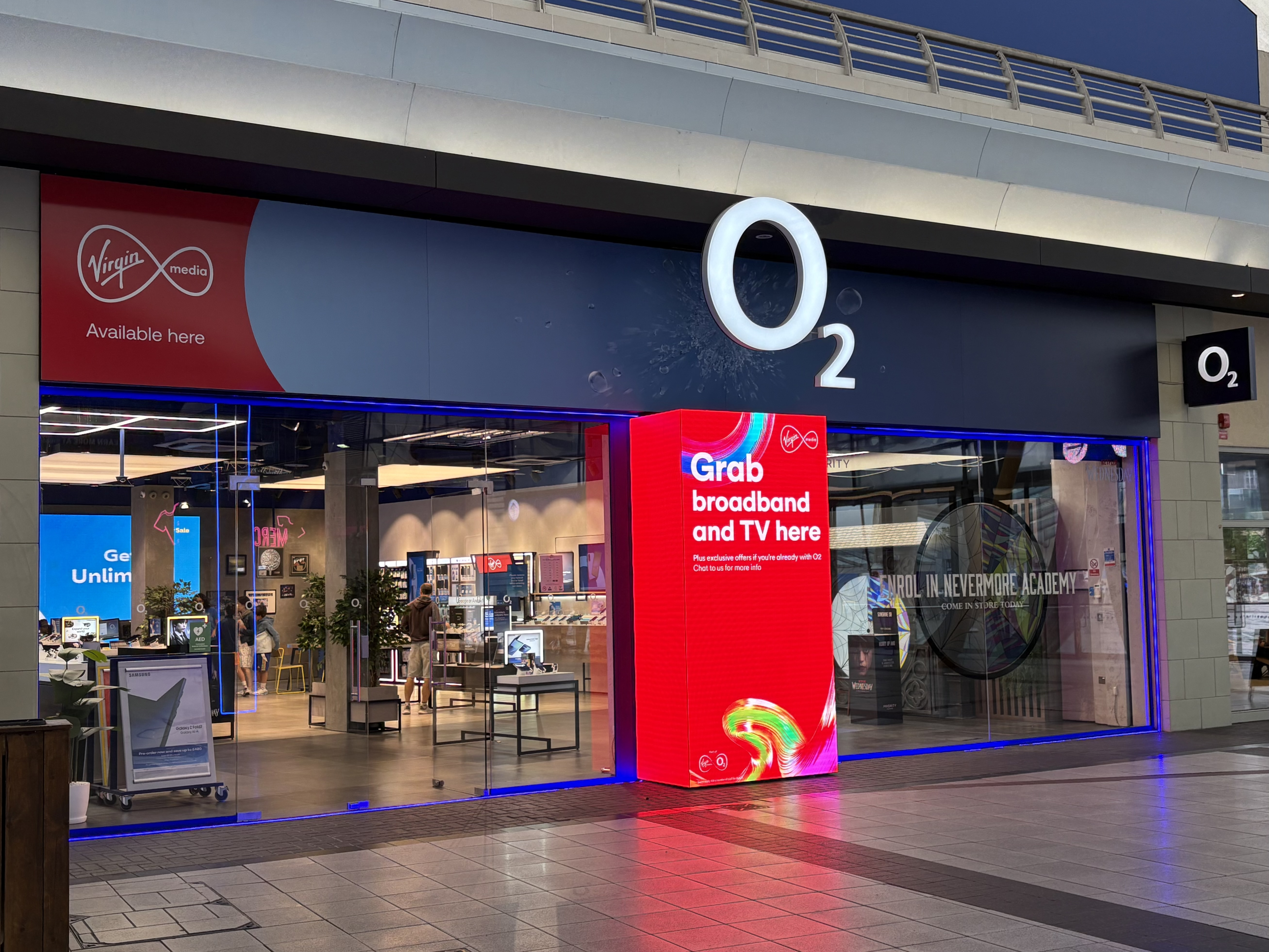
An O2 store in The O2, London, UK

The company was formed in 1983 as Telecom Securicor Cellular Radio Limited, a 60:40 joint venture between British Telecom and Securicor led by John Carrington. It launched the Cellnet network on 7 January 1985, six days after the launch of Vodafone. In 1999, BT acquired Securicor's share of Cellnet and the company was later rebranded as BT Cellnet. In June 2000, BT Cellnet launched the world's first commercial General Packet Radio Service (GPRS) service. The company, together with BT Group's mobile telecommunications businesses in Germany, Ireland and the Netherlands, was part of the BT Wireless division. This was spun off from the BT Group in 2002 to form a new holding company, mmO2 plc, which introduced the "O2" brand for the businesses. In 2005, mmO2 plc was renamed O2 plc.

O2 plc was purchased by the Spanish telecommunications company Telefónica in 2006 for £18 billion. Under the terms of the acquisition, Telefónica agreed to retain the "O_{2}" brand and the company's UK headquarters. O2 plc was renamed Telefónica O_{2} Europe in 2007 and then Telefónica Europe plc in 2008, and became the holding company for Telefónica's operations in the UK.

In May 2020, Telefónica reached an agreement with Liberty Global to merge the company with Virgin Media. On 1 June 2021, O2 and Virgin Media formally merged to create Virgin Media O2 as a joint venture between Telefónica and Liberty Global.

=== 1985 to 2005 ===
Between 1985 and 1989, John Carrington was the CEO of British Telecom's Mobile Division and the chairman of Cellnet. It was during this period that Carrington launched Cellnet's first cellular service, following innovative development work by BT Spectrum, who built a chain of cells between London Heathrow and BT Tower in January 1985.

Cellnet was established in 1985 as a joint subsidiary of BTCR, British Telecom Cellular Radio, providing the engineering knowledge, and TSCR, Telecom Securicor Cellular Radio Limited, providing the financial investment, resulting in a 60:40 joint venture between British Telecommunications and Securicor.

The equipment used was primarily a Motorola system designed for the American Advanced Mobile Phone System (AMPS) and had to be adapted for the British system, Total Access Communication (TACS). The system was so unready that the initials that Motorola used to designate the network exchanges, EMX, became popularly known as 'European Motorola Experiment' and the exchanges had to be programmed in machine code loaded by tape. In the early days of the system, mobile calls cost £1 per minute.

After months of rumours and speculation, Peter Bonfield publicly announced on 27 July 1999 that BT had agreed to buy Securicor's 40 per cent share of Cellnet for £3.15 billion. Cellnet had five million customers at the time of its acquisition. The company was rebranded as BT Cellnet in 2000, and it became a part of BT Wireless, a group of companies owned by BT.

BT announced on 3 September 2001 that the BT Wireless business would be spun off from the main group as a newly listed holding company, mmO2 plc, operating under the "O2" brand. Shareholders approved the plan at an extraordinary general meeting on 23 October 2001. BT Cellnet relaunched as "O2" on 18 June 2002, along with other former BT subsidiaries: Esat Digifone in Ireland, Viag Interkom in Germany and Telfort Mobiel in the Netherlands.

The rebranding was supported by a European advertising campaign, which began on 16 April 2002, across all four countries, at a cost of £130 million. The main launch campaign ran from 18 June and was developed by Vallance Carruthers Coleman Priest, working alongside brand consultancy Lambie-Nairn, creators of the "O2" brand identity.

In March 2005, mmO2 restructured its shares and the company was relisted as O2 plc.

=== Telefónica acquisition ===
On 30 November 2005, O2 agreed to a takeover by Telefónica, a Spanish telecommunications company, for £17.7 billion (£2 per share) in cash. It went through finally in 2006. According to the merger announcement, O2 retained its name and continued to be based in the United Kingdom, keeping both the brand and the management team. The merger became unconditional on 23 January 2006.

Following the acquisition of O2, Telefónica undertook a corporate organisational change that saw the merging of its fixed and mobile businesses in Spain, and the transfer of Telefónica's non-Spanish European telecommunications properties into the O2 brand. Thus, the Český Telecom and Eurotel operations in the Czech Republic as well as the Telefónica Deutschland business in Germany were brought under the control of O2, which retained its UK-registered public company status with its own board of directors and corporate structures and processes. Telefónica chose to keep its existing mobile phone operations in the rest of the world under the brand Movistar. This name is used in Spain and in most of the Latin American countries, operated by a separate management team.

=== Since 2007 ===
On 15 July 2009, O2 entered the financial services industry with the launch of O2 Money, which was the first step in the process of incorporating financial services into mobile phones. Future plans included manufacturing Near Field Communication (NFC) technology in mobile phones in the United Kingdom.

O2 and Vodafone signed a deal in June 2012 which will see the two companies 'pool' their network technology, creating a single national grid of 18,500 transmitter sites. Both networks will continue to carry their own independent mobile spectrum.

=== Sale attempts ===
On 24 November 2014, it was reported that BT were in talks to buy back O2, while at the same time BT confirmed that it was also in talks to buy EE. BT subsequently entered into exclusive talks with EE.

On 23 January 2015, Li Ka-shing, owner of Hutchison Whampoa and the Three network (which operates in the UK) entered talks to buy O2 for up to £10.25bn ($15.4bn). However, the move faced scrutiny from competition regulators as it would reduce the number of major operators in the UK, when combined with a potential purchase of EE by BT, from four to three. Hutchison Whampoa had previously acquired the O2 network from Telefónica in the Republic of Ireland, which it has since merged into Three. The combined network would have surpassed EE to create the largest mobile network in the UK.

The deal was subject to regulatory approval. The European Commission decided in December 2015 not to refer Hutchison's takeover of Telefónica's O2 business in the UK to the country's Competition and Markets Authority, which had asked to be allowed to investigate the planned acquisition, arguing that as the British competition regulator, it – and not the Commission – should have the right to rule on the transaction, which it argued 'threatens to affect significantly competition in the UK retail mobile and wholesale mobile markets', claiming that its investigation of the takeover would 'avoid duplication and fragmentation'. On 11 May 2016, the European Commission officially blocked the tie-up of O2 and Three, arguing that the merger would reduce consumer choice and lead to a higher cost of services.

In September 2016, Telefónica appointed a number of investment banks to sell the business to investors, ahead of a stock market flotation.

=== Merger with Virgin Media ===
On 7 May 2020, it was announced that Telefónica had agreed to merge Telefonica UK with Liberty Global subsidiary Virgin Media, subject to approval, into a 50/50 joint venture. Subject to approval, the merger was slated for the middle of 2021. The merger was completed on 1 June 2021 with the newly merged company positioning itself as competition with BT.

=== Outages ===
In July 2012, O2 had to apologise to almost 8 million customers after a network switching subsystem failure led to a 24-hour blackout of the service across the UK and Ireland. The problem, which prevented a third of its customers' phones registering on the network, also affected customers of MVNO networks Tesco Mobile and Giffgaff. To apologise for this, O2 announced that it would be giving hundreds of thousands of its customers compensation for the issue. Pay monthly customers received a 10 per cent discount on their bill whereas Pay As You Go users received a 10 per cent refund on their first top up in September.

On 6 December 2018, a major disruption to the O2 network, caused by faulty software, left up to 32 million users (including those on MVNOs) without access to data services (on both 3G and 4G) for up to 24 hours. During the outage, some voice and text services suffered from congestion.

== Network ==
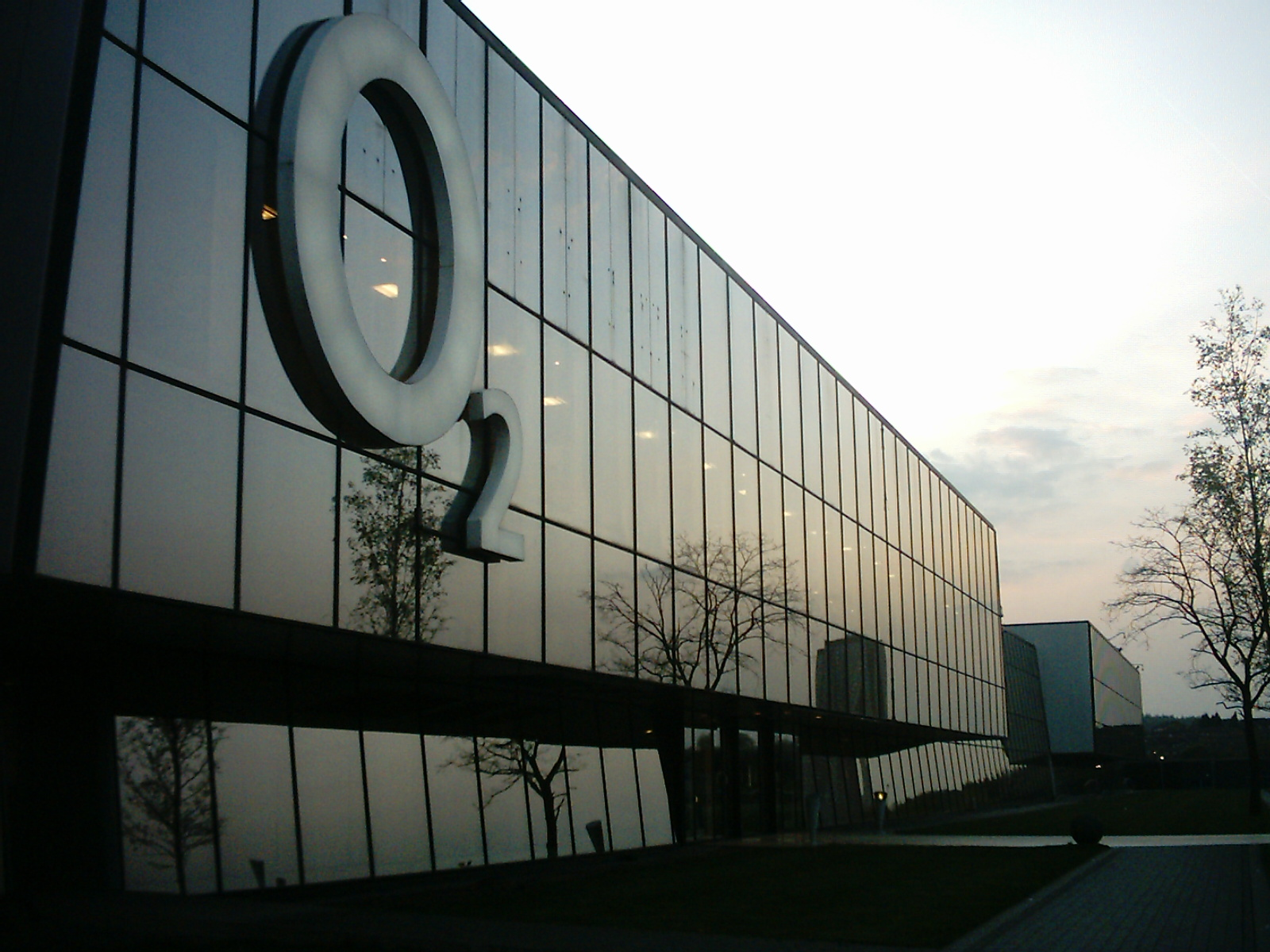
The O2 offices in Leeds

BT Cellnet launched the world's first GPRS network on 22 June 2000, although GPRS-enabled devices were uncommon at that time.

O2 publicly announced on 15 December 2009 that it had successfully demonstrated a 4G connection using LTE technology installed in six masts in Slough. The technology, which was supplied by Huawei, achieved a peak downlink rate of 150 Mbps.

In January 2012, the company announced plans to provide free internet to millions of residents and visitors in central London, by launching Europe's largest free Wi-Fi zone, along with free Wi-Fi access for anyone on any network in and around every O2 retail store.

On 20 February 2013, Ofcom announced that O2 had been awarded spectrum in the 800 MHz band for 4G LTE coverage, bidding around £550 million for the spectrum. This spectrum came with a coverage obligation from Ofcom, and O2 is obliged to provide a mobile broadband service for indoor reception to at least 98 per cent of the UK population (expected to cover at least 99 per cent when outdoors) and at least 95 per cent of the population of each of the UK nations – England, Northern Ireland, Scotland and Wales – by the end of 2017 at the latest. The 4G LTE service became available to customers in London, Leeds and Bradford on 29 August 2013, and expanded to a further ten cities by the end of the year.

On 27 March 2017, following the release of iOS 10.3, O2 launched VoLTE (4G) and WiFi Calling for iPhone 7 and iPhone 7 Plus users, and stated more devices would be eligible at a later date. The facility was later extended to other makes and models of mobile phone.

Frequencies used on the O2 UK network
Frequency	Band	Protocol	Class
900 MHz		GSM/GPRS/EDGE	2G
700 MHz	28	LTE/LTE Advanced	4G/4G+
800 MHz	20	LTE/LTE Advanced	4G/4G+
900 MHz	8	LTE/LTE Advanced	4G/4G+
1,800 MHz	3	LTE/LTE Advanced	4G/4G+
2,100 MHz	1	LTE/LTE Advanced	4G/4G+
2,300 MHz	40	TD-LTE	4G/4G+
2,600 MHz	38	TD-LTE	4G/4G+
700 MHz	n28	5G NR	5G
900 MHz	n8	5G NR	5G
2,100 MHz	n1	5G NR	5G
3,500 MHz	n78	5G NR	5G

== Former operations ==
=== Fixed line and broadband ===
Alongside mobile telephone services, the company also provided fixed line services and home broadband.

O2 purchased Be Un Limited, an internet service provider in the UK, for £50 million in June 2006. O2 retained the Be brand, and launched a separate O2-branded broadband service on 15 October 2007, using the Be network.

O2 announced in June 2011 a fibre optic broadband service designed to compete with the BT Infinity product, using FTTC technology.

BSkyB agreed on 1 March 2013 to buy the fixed telephone line and broadband business of Telefonica UK, trading under the O2 and Be brands. The company agreed to pay £180 million initially, followed by a further £20 million after all customers had been transferred to Sky's existing business. The sale was subject to regulatory approval in April 2013, and was subsequently approved by the Office of Fair Trading on 16 May 2013.

=== Payment system ===
O2 began trialling a near-field communication (NFC) payment system in 2007. In 2009, O2 was in discussions with large retailers, such as Tesco and W. H. Smith, for the deployment of the necessary electronic point of sale units, and with handset manufacturers, such as Apple and Samsung, to enable NFC technology on all future devices.

On 23 February 2011, O2 announced it would launch a "second phase" for O2 Money, by discontinuing its branded cash cards in favour of a "mobile wallet" application for Android and iOS devices. The application would use NFC technology embedded in a phone to access money.

It was announced on 9 January 2014 that the O2 wallet service would close on 31 March 2014.

== Marketing ==
=== Branding ===
The BT Cellnet consumer brand was renamed O_{2} – the chemical symbol for an oxygen molecule – as were all the group's other businesses (other than Manx Telecom). The rebranding was overseen by the Lambie-Nairn design agency, which developed the idea of the company supplying services that were essential, much the same as oxygen is essential for life. The company logo and associated graphics were designed using air bubbles to present this concept. The bubbles were photographed by London-based photographer Jonathan Knowles. In 2002, O2 used Leftfield's dance track "Release the Pressure" in their ads.

O2 adopted the slogan "See what you can do" in 2002 after the company's demerger from BT. In April 2008, the slogan changed to "We're better, connected". In July 2013 the slogan changed to "Be more dog", followed by "More for you" in June 2016 and "Breathe it all in" in September 2018. After the merger of Virgin Media and O2's parent companies, older variations of the slogans returned, now being shared with Virgin Media. The 2008 slogan "We're better, connected" returned in November 2021, and March 2023 saw the return of O2's original slogan "See what you can do". In 2025, O2 adopted the slogan and new brand platform of "Essential for Living". All of O2's marketing campaigns to date have been created by London advertising agency VCCP.

Since the launch of the O2 brand, actor Sean Bean has narrated the company's marketing campaigns.

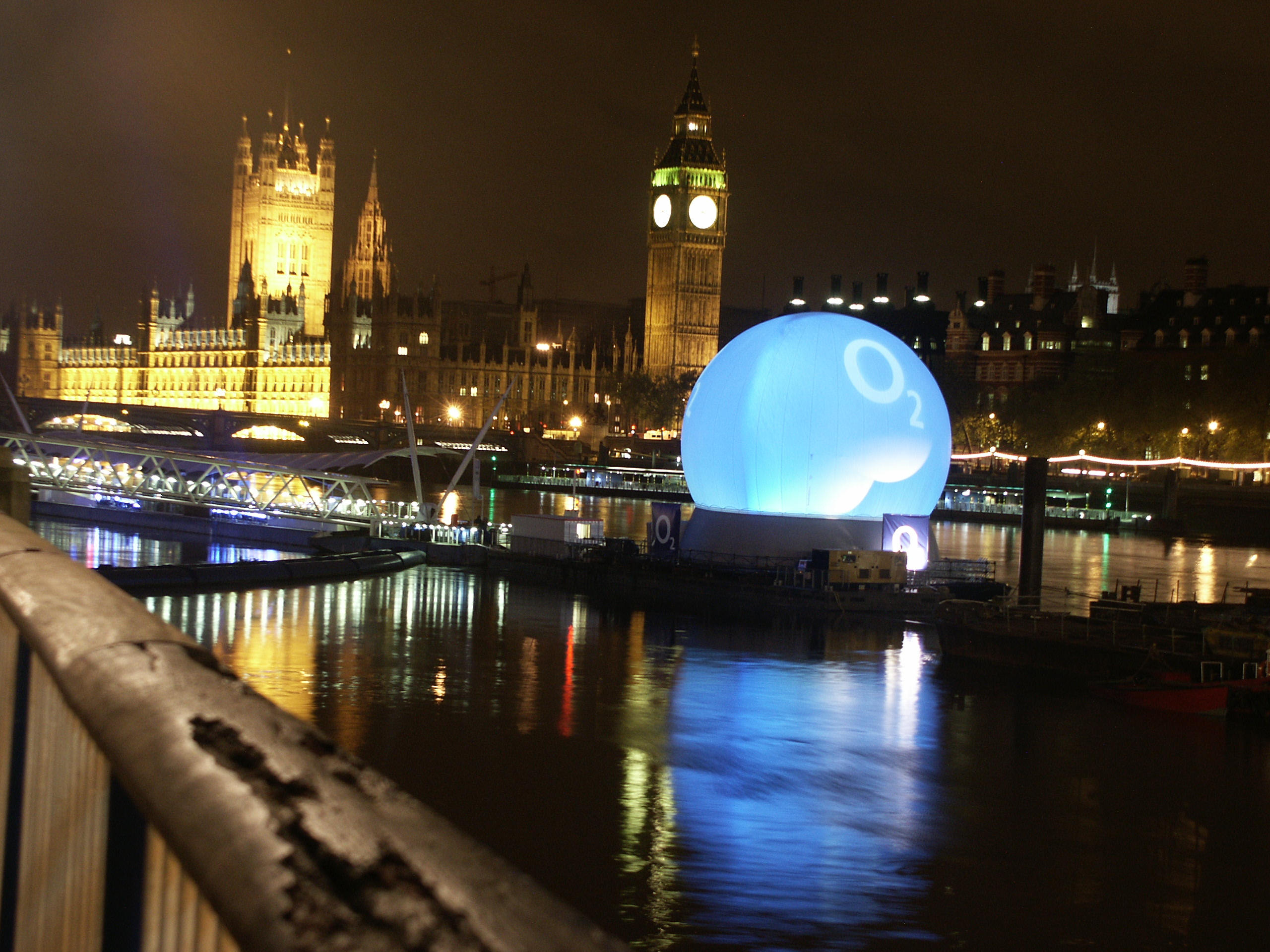
O2 brand launch event, River Thames, 30 April 2002

=== Sponsorships ===
O2 currently sponsor the England rugby team, and in 2003 launched a mobile video service allowing customers to download or stream video content related to the 2003 Rugby World Cup. The initial deal was signed in 1995, as Cellnet, and then renewed in 2000 as BT Cellnet. In 2005, Telefónica O2 extended their involvement in rugby union, signing a new deal with the England rugby team and the Rugby Football Union, as well as O2 rugbyclass and Premier Rugby Ltd for the English Premiership. Their latest renewal of the sponsorship was in 2016, which ran for five years until September 2021 and was again renewed in 2021 for another 5 years till 2026 and in November 2025 the sponsorship was again extended for another 5 years till 2031.

Additionally, Telefónica O2 had a long-standing relationship with Arsenal F.C., being their shirt sponsor until the end of the 2005/2006 season. In 2005, a three-year deal was signed that saw Telefónica O2 become the team's exclusive mobile communications partner.

O2 were the main sponsor of the Channel 4 reality TV show Big Brother from its second series (as BT Cellnet) in 2001 until its fourth series in 2003. They also sponsored the spin-off shows Celebrity Big Brother 2 in 2002 and Teen Big Brother in 2003. In total O2 sponsored five series of the show.

In 2022, O2 entered into its first boxing sponsorship deal with boxer Shannon Ryan.

In July 2026, after obtaining the naming rights to the SSE Arena, Belfast, it took over SSE's previous title partner of the Belfast Giants ice hockey team.

=== Naming rights ===
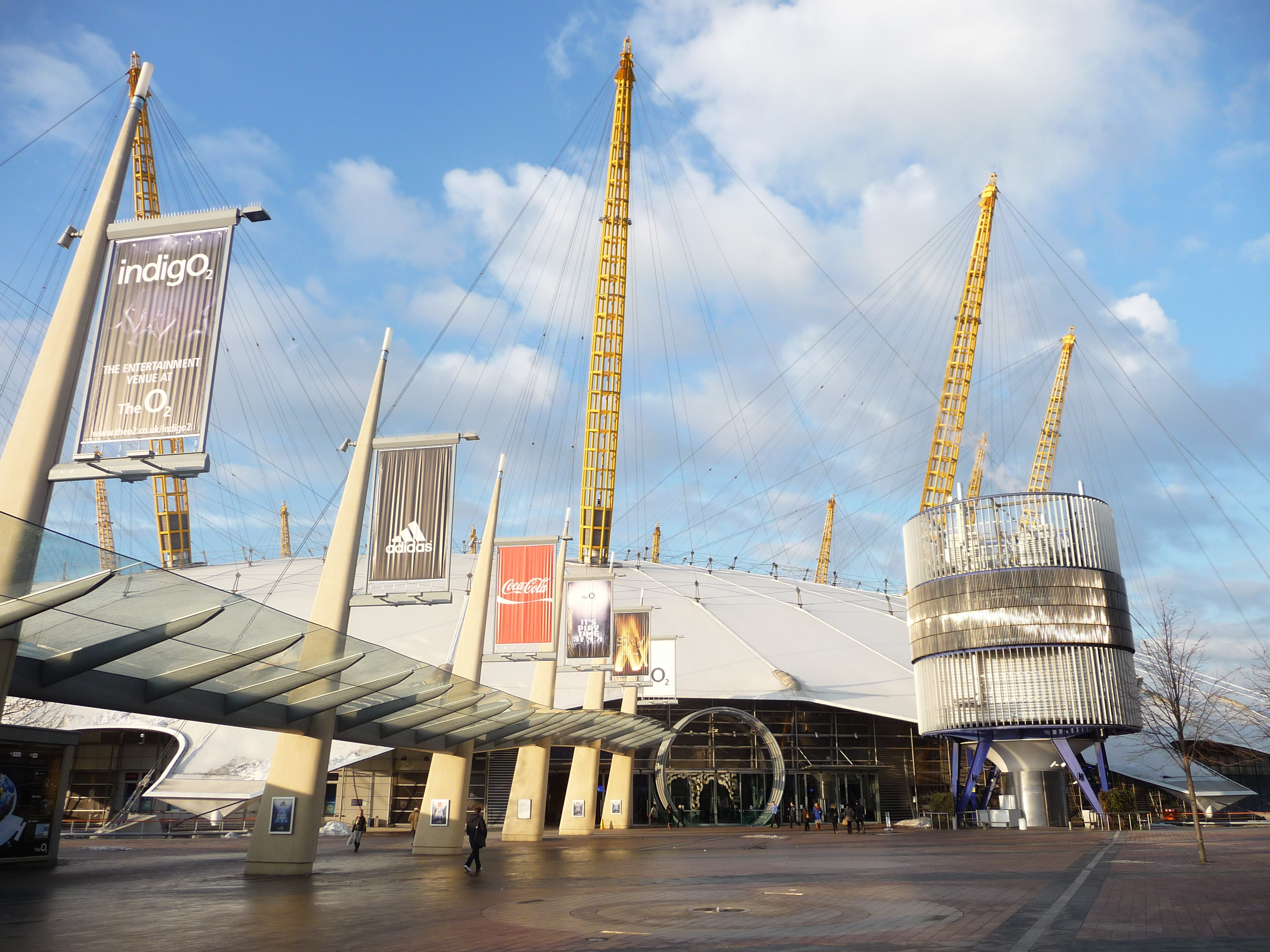
The O2 entrance

Since 2007, O2 has held the naming rights to The O2 entertainment district in London. The Millennium Dome has been transformed and rebranded by O2 into an entertainment venue.

The O2 Arena was the site of the artistic gymnastics events and medal rounds in basketball for the 2012 Summer Olympics.

In February 2017, in a continuation of its agreement with AEG, the developers of the site, O2 announced that it had renewed its naming rights for a further ten years till 2027.

In July 2026, O2 obtained the naming rights of the previously named SSE Arena, Belfast in Northern Ireland after SSE ended its sponsorship after 11 years. The contract with The Odyssey Trust runs for 10 years, and is due to expire in 2036. It was renamed The O2 Belfast.

On 7 October 2026, O2 announced that they had extended their naming rights contract with AEG for both The O2 and Indigo at The O2 for a further eleven years until 2038.

==== Academy Music Group venues ====

Since 2008, O2 is partnered with Live Nation, allowing O2 to rename its Academy Music Group music venues. The partnership allows O2 to offer customers priority access to all events at O2 Academy venues as well as Live Nation promoted events across the United Kingdom. The partnership was renewed in 2017 for a further ten years till 2027.

== Environmental record ==
In February 2009, O2 became the first mobile telecommunications provider to be certified with the Carbon Trust Standard in recognition of its commitment to reduce its carbon footprint. O2 attained the standard after saving 47,000 tonnes of carbon over the previous three years through its energy efficiency measures, including a £1.4 million distribution of smart metering technology across the company's cell sites, offices and retail stores, and upgrades to more energy efficient systems across its mobile phone network. In addition to distributing energy efficient LED lighting and boiler system controls, the company was also able to reduce energy use by removing air conditioning units from some of its cell sites and reducing computer monitor standby times.

O2 was a voluntary participant in the 10:10 climate change campaign, which required participants to cut their carbon emissions by 10 per cent by the end of 2010, and since broadened its approach to include a range of projects focused on carbon reduction and renewable energy.

It was reported that in 2019, O2 achieved recertification from the Carbon Trust Standard for supply chain, at level 3, the highest level possible. In 2020, O2 pledged that they would be carbon neutral by 2025. In the same year, they claimed to have recycled over three million devices since 2009 and invested £400 million in renewable energy since 2008.
