= Digital Rights Ireland =

Digital rights advocacy and lobbying group

Digital Rights Ireland is a digital rights advocacy and lobbying group based in Ireland. The group works for civil liberties in a digital age.

== Telecommunications data retention ==
In 2012, the group brought an action before the Irish High Court, which subsequently made a reference to the Court of Justice of the European Union to take legal action over telecommunications data retention provided for by the Criminal Justice (Terrorist Offences) Act of 2005.

Digital Rights Ireland argues that the act led to Gardaí accessing retained data without having a specific crime to investigate, citing remarks by the Data Protection Commissioner.

On 8 April 2014, the Court of Justice of the European Union declared the Directive invalid in response to a case brought by Digital Rights Ireland against the Irish authorities and others.

== File sharing ==
The Irish Recorded Music Association has sent letters to people it accuses of file sharing their music, demanding damages for financial losses. One issue is how the files belonging to the alleged file-sharers were searched. MediaSentry software was used to search their machines, but as it doesn't limit itself to searching only folders used for file sharing, this led to questions of violation of privacy. MediaSentry itself is based in the United States, which has less legislation about data protection than the European Union. This has been an issue in cases in the Netherlands and France.

Another issue is Internet service providers being compelled to identify users.

Current action still causes concern to DRI.

Former TD Dr. Jerry Cowley has requested that the complaints referee investigate whether his telephone is being tapped. DRI expressed concern, noting that there is no Irish equivalent of the Wilson Doctrine in Irish law. Fine Gael has also shown concern at the number of telephone taps authorised by former Minister for Justice Michael McDowell. DRI said that the reasons for withholding the information was unacceptable.

== Other areas of work ==
Other issues addressed by the group include:

- ID cards
- Electronic passports
- Online defamation
- Leaking of confidential information by civil servants

== See also ==
- Internet censorship in the Republic of Ireland
- Digital rights
