= Telfort =

Brand of KPN

- Company type: Subsidiary
- Industry: Telecommunication
- Founded: 1997
- Founder: British Telecommunications; Nederlandse Spoorwegen
- Defunct: 1 May 2019
- Headquarters: Netherlands
- Products: Mobile telecommunications IPTV; Internet; Fixed telephony
- Parent: KPN
- Website: telfort.nl at the Wayback Machine (archived 2019-01-03)

Telfort was a brand of Dutch mobile telecommunication company KPN.

It operated a GSM mobile telecommunications service in the Netherlands. It marketed itself as being the cheapest option available, and went to some lengths to give the appearance of being a no frills operator.

== History ==
Logo used in 1996-2003

Logo used in 2003-2009

The company was formed in 1997 as a joint venture between British Telecommunications (BT) and Nederlandse Spoorwegen (Dutch Railways). In 2000, BT bought out Nederlandse Spoorwegen's shareholding. The group became part of the BT Wireless business and after its spin-off as mmO2, became known as O2 Netherlands. However, in 2003, O2 sold the company to Greenfield Capital Partners. It then reverted to the Telfort name. In July 2005 Telfort was sold to telephone company KPN.

In October 2007, KPN, which had bought the Dutch operations of Tiscali some months earlier, rebranded Tiscali's Internet services as Telfort Internet. It has, since then, expanded its operations to include fixed phone lines and digital television (IPTV) subscriptions.

In 2018, Telfort ceased to exist as a separate legal entity and became a brand name of KPN.

In January 2019, KPN announced that it would eventually phase out the Telfort brand and continue operations under the KPN brand. The Telfort brand ceased accepting new customers on 1 May 2019. Existing mobile customers were migrated to the KPN brand in January 2020. Migration of fixed-line VDSL customers started in September 2020.
