= Clear Mobile =

Mobile phone provider in Ireland

- Type: Subsidiary
- Industry: Telecommunications
- Founded: 14 January 2021; 5 years ago
- Headquarters: Ireland
- Area served: Ireland
- Products: Mobile telecommunications products and services
- Owner: Vodafone
- Website: clearmobile.ie

Clear Mobile is a mobile telephone network running as a mobile virtual network operator (MVNO) using Vodafone's Irish network. Vodafone owns Clear Mobile. Clear Mobile was launched on 14 January 2021.

== Products and services ==
Since launch, Clear Mobile has offered one product, which is a sim-only mobile contract. The package is post-paid and includes unlimited calls to Irish mobiles and landlines, unlimited texts to Irish mobiles, unlimited 5G data and 19 GB EU data.

== Customer service ==
Clear Mobile has no customer service phone lines. All support is via social media and online channels.
