= O2 (Ireland) =

Former broadband and telecommunications provider in Ireland

Telefónica O2 Ireland Limited
- Type: Subsidiary
- Industry: Telecommunications; Broadband Internet access
- Predecessor: Esat Digifone 1996
- Founded: Ireland (1997)
- Founder: Esat Telecom Group
- Defunct: 2 March 2015
- Fate: Bought out by and later Merged into Three (3) (03/2015)
- Successor: Three Ireland (Hutchison) Limited
- Headquarters: 28–29 Sir John Rogerson's Quay, Dublin, Ireland
- Area served: Ireland
- Brands: 48 Months
- Revenue: ▼€905 million (2009)
- Number of employees: 1,787 (2006)
- Parent: Telefónica (2005–2013); Hutchison 3G Ireland Ltd. (2014–2015)
- Website: www.o2.ie

Telefónica Ireland was a broadband and telecommunications provider in Ireland that traded under the O2 brand (typeset as O_{2}). O2 Ireland was previously called Esat Digifone when it was owned by Esat Telecommunications (and Telenor) from 1997 to 2006.

O2 Ireland became a subsidiary of Telefónica in 2006, after its parent company O2 in the United Kingdom was purchased. In June 2013, Hutchison Whampoa announced it would acquire the Irish arm of O2 for €780 million. O2 was merged into Hutchison Whampoa's subsidiary Three Ireland in March 2015.

== History ==
=== 1997–2000: Origin ===
Esat Digifone

In 1995, the government, with Michael Lowry as Minister for Transport, Energy, and Communications, authorised a second mobile phone network, to compete with Eircell owned by the semi-state Telecom Éireann. The licence was awarded to Esat Digifone, a joint venture between Denis O'Brien's company Esat Telecommunications and Norway's Telenor, which began operations in 1997. In 2008, the Moriarty Tribunal found that the awarding of the licence was influenced by payments made to Lowry by O'Brien.

=== 2000–2001: BT ownership. ===
In 1999, Esat Telecom and Telenor began to dispute how Esat Digifone should be operated. Telenor removed the word Esat from the companies name, and began the attempted removal of Denis O'Brien as chairman of Digifone. Esat Telecom retaliated by threatening to take legal action against Telenor, and make repeated offers to buy Telenor's share of Digifone.

In November 1999, Telenor placed a bid for the entire share capital of Esat Telecom as a way of resolving the conflict. The bid was rejected by the majority shareholders of Esat Telecommunications who voted against the takeover. In January 2000, British Telecommunications counteracted Esat Telecom failed bid by placing its own bid to buy Telenor's shares in Digifone.

In January 2000, British Telecommunications made a takeover offer for Telenor which was backed by Esat Telecommunications shareholders. Esat Telecommunications became a wholly owned subsidiary of British Telecommunications and was delisted from the stock market. When BT acquired Esat, they began integrating the business along with its Northern Ireland subsidiary, BT (NI). This eventually became BT Ireland. However Esat Digifone was not part of the operations integrated with BT's existing Irish operations. Instead, it became part of the BT Wireless division within BT, and was briefly rebranded simply Digifone. This branding lasted for less than six months.

=== 2001–2005: Demerger from BT Ireland ===
In 2001, the BT Wireless division became mmO2 plc, a separate company, through a demerger from BT. British Telecommunications shareholders received 1 BT Group and 1 mmO2 share for each British Telecommunications share they held. After the de-merger, most of mmO2's operations, including Digifone, were rebranded O2. mmO2 plc later became O2 plc and remained an independent company until 2005.

=== 2005–2006: Telefónica transition ===
On 31 October 2005 it was announced that Telefónica, had made a recommended takeover bid for O_{2} Ireland's parent company, O2 plc. This was then approved by shareholders and O_{2} was officially purchased in mid February 2006. The O2 brand is now used in several countries for Telefónica's mobile operations outside Spain and Latin America, where Telefónica fixed line and mobile services are branded as Movistar. In January 2009, it was revealed that Ireland was nearly the most profitable market in the world for multinational mobile operators like O2.

=== 2006–2013 ===
On 23 March 2009 Vodafone and O2's parent company Telefónica announced a deal to share their existing networks in Ireland and rollout future infrastructure jointly.

On 6 April 2011 it was announced that Telefónica O2 Ireland and Eircom had agreed a new network sharing partnership.

=== 2013: Hutchison 3 Ireland merger ===
On 24 June 2013, it was announced that Hutchison Whampoa would acquire Telefónica's Irish mobile operations for €780 million, to be merged into 3 Ireland upon completion of the deal. The deal was cleared by the EU in June 2014. On 15 July 2014, the acquisition was fully completed.

On 2 March 2015 it was announced on social media and the News that O2 Ireland and Three Ireland were merging.

Three moved into O2's HQ at 37–38 Sir Rogerson's Quay sometime after the acquisition.

Three took over The O2's sponsorship in Dublin, and successfully rebranded it to 3Arena on September 4th, 2014

The merger meant that Three Ireland had over 1.5 million customers on their network putting them up near the customer numbers of Vodafone Ireland.

== Services ==
O2 was the second largest telecommunications provider in Ireland, with approximately 40% market share or 1.6 million customers. The company's STD prefix was 086, but following the introduction of full number portability, some O2 Irish mobile numbers featured prefixes starting 087, 085, 089 or 083, as customers may switch provider but keep their old phone number.

The company provided WAP and GPRS services under the O_{2} Active brand. In October 2005, O_{2} Ireland launched a version of NTT DoCoMo's i-mode service. The company held a UMTS licence, and was the third Irish operator to offer 3G services, after Vodafone Ireland and Three Ireland, offering services in some built-up areas in late 2006.

=== O2 Broadband ===
In July 2007, O2 launched its mobile broadband offering in Ireland using HSDPA technology over its 3G network. They provided speeds of up to 7.2 Mbit/s and claimed to cover 90% of the population on the least contended Irish 3G network following an upgrade in 2007.

=== Speak Easy ===
Speak Easy was the name of O2 Ireland's prepaid service. In 2007 they became the first Irish operator to offer free text messages to all Irish mobile numbers, although it only applied for weekends. However, in early 2008 they introduced a new tariff which offered unlimited free text messages to all networks at any time, for life.

The term "speak easy" was introduced when the company was branded as Esat Digifone

=== O2 Freedom ===
The O2 Freedom plans were introduced in June 2013 which offered 2 main new price plans, Freedom talk and Freedom Internet. O2 was the first Irish operator to offer free calls to all networks at any time on prepay. This offer was Freedom Talk and gave customers Unlimited calls to all Irish mobiles and landlines which required a €20 top up of which €10 was deducted for the offer. Freedom Internet offered 1 GB of data and 350 any network texts. Same terms applied as per Freedom talk. In December 2013 the data allowance of 1 GB was increased to 7.5 GB which O2 advertised as Unlimited Internet. Along with the new price plan O2 also launched a vast amount of prepay addons such as Talk, Text, Data, International Talk and International text.

== Corporate affairs ==
=== Company structure ===
In 2010, O2 underwent a restructuring phase, implementing a number of cost-cutting measures which involved outsourcing internal divisions to external companies. O2's IT division was outsourced to IBM Ireland, while the Network Operations division was outsourced to BT Ireland (who also run the network operations for Three Ireland). The Network team outsource was limited to the Field Operations team along with some other support functions. The Network rollout team & Transmission team remained in-house to facilitate future network changes. It was more cost effective to retain these divisions in-house.

=== Charitable activities ===
In 2006 O2 chose Irish Autism Action as their charity of choice. The three-year deal involved sponsorship, creating awareness, using O2 staff to assist the charity and using technology developed by O2 to assist children affected by autism. In 2010, the company's charity of choice became Headstrong, a charity providing mental health support to young people.

=== Sponsorship programmes ===
Over the years, O2 entered into some very high-profile sponsorship arrangements. In 1998 the then ESAT Digifone committed its support to the Hurlers & Footballers of Cork. They remained sponsors of Cork GAA for ten years.

Another high-profile sponsorship agreement was their association with the Irish Rugby Football Union and the Ireland national team, which has been continued by Three. Building on their rugby links with Shannon RFU, O2 joined forces with the top level of rugby in Ireland. They also sponsored the West Stand at Ireland's former home ground, Lansdowne Road.

They were also the title sponsor of one of the country's most high-profile venue, "The O2", now renamed the "3Arena".

They were title sponsor of the Aisling Foundation's Ability Awards.

=== Chief executive ===
Tony Hanway was Chief Executive of Telefónica Ireland from his appointment in September 2011 until March 2015. Hanway first joined Telefónica in Ireland in 2005 as Head of Customer Care, subsequently becoming Consumer Sales Director. Immediately prior to taking the role, Hanway headed up the Consumer division of Telefónica in the Czech Republic, managing a team of over 4000 people across the retail, online and customer care functions.

== Criticism ==
In July 2004 the company admitted overcharging 71,000 customers following a review of its systems. The disclosure meant that 136,535 O2 subscribers – more than 10 per cent of its customer base – were overcharged.

Analysis by the Sunday Independent in January 2006 showed the massive margins being earned by Vodafone and O2 in the country were costing Irish mobile phone users about €300m a year. If the mobile phone companies were to cut their Irish margins to the group average, O2 customers would end up paying €84.07 less every year (€7 a month less).

The European Commission upheld a ruling by the Irish regulatory body, ComReg, that the Irish mobile phone market needed greater competition, and acknowledged that "tacit collusion possibly existed between O2 and Vodafone".

In May 2007, O2 Ireland management announced that the entire O2 Ireland technical staff were to be outsourced to a single Managed Service Provider. The next month O2 customers got a busy signal or no dial tone at all when they tried to make calls due to a network glitch. The reason for the glitch remained a mystery at the time because the company's spokesperson couldn't be reached by the media on her mobile, also seemingly affected by the problem.

The Consumers' Association of Ireland lodged a complaint with the Competition Authority over a loophole used by O2 that allowed it to bombard customers with unwanted text messages.

The telecoms lobby group ALTO criticised O2 Ireland for its decision to quadruple the revenue it generated from calls to the 1850 LoCall number. This is a fixed price, shared cost service used by charities and a number of public service bodies.

The company was criticised for its monthly subscription fees levied on Irish users of the iPhone, as they represented poor value for money when compared with the services available to customers paying similar amounts in the UK. Less than 48 hours after the much hyped launch of Apple's latest model, owners of all phones on the O2 network discovered they could not access the internet at all due to a network failure. Further criticism came from iPhone customers regarding the continued failure of O2 to deploy Visual Voicemail. O2 was the only carrier in the world to launch the original iPhone without Visual Voicemail, one of its headline features.

O2 was responsible for the highest number of registered judgments, which financially blacklists those people who do not pay their bills on time in August 2008.

The Advertising Standards Authority upheld complaints concerning advertisements by O2.

In August 2010, O2 was warned by the telecoms watchdog, ComReg, that it could not move customers to online billing without their explicit agreement.

In March 2011, O2 pleaded guilty to a breach of the Data Protection Act at the Dublin District Court.

In March 2011, it was revealed that Denis O'Brien made payments to the Minister for Communications, Michael Lowry, to aid Esat Digifone's licence bid.

== See also ==
- List of Irish companies
- List of mobile network operators of Europe
