= BT Ireland =

Irish telecommunications and internet company

BT Communications Ireland Ltd.
- Type: Subsidiary
- Industry: Telecommunications
- Founded: 1990; 36 years ago (as Esat Telecom)
- Parent: BT Group
- Website: www.btireland.com

BT Communications (Ireland) Limited is a telecommunications and internet company in Ireland. It is a subsidiary of BT Group plc.

== History ==
=== Esat Telecom ===
The company was founded in 1990 by a consortium headed by business magnate Denis O'Brien and was originally known as Esat Telecom. The name Esat, said to be an abbreviation of "Éireann Satellite" and connected to O'Brien's bid for Ireland's communications satellite licence under the 1977 ITU frequency plans, would become much more associated with telecommunications in Ireland, however.

Esat Telecom applied a number of times for a telecommunications licence to the Department of Communications and was finally granted a limited one in March 1993. The company officially launched its services on 20 April 1994. It was the first domestic competitor to Bord Telecom Éireann (now Eircom) and, after initially reselling leased lines from that company, used "autodiallers" to route calls onto its network.

These devices proved controversial, with Telecom Éireann threatening legal action and the Department of Communications contending that these were a breach of Esat's limited licence. However, an Esat complaint to the European Commission was upheld, and eventually in 1997, the new Director of Telecommunications Regulation (now called ComReg) regularised Esat's position by ordering Telecom Éireann to provide a service to switch calls onto Esat's network.

In 1996, Esat Telecom, in conjunction with Telenor AB, bid successfully for the second GSM mobile telecommunications licence, against five other consortia. This became known as Esat Digifone. The Moriarty Tribunal found in 2008 that the awarding of the licence was influenced by payments made by O'Brien to Michael Lowry, the Minister for Transport, Energy and Communications. On 7 November 1997, Esat Telecom Group plc held an initial public offering and was listed on the Irish Stock Exchange, London Stock Exchange, and NASDAQ stock market.

Originally the company targeted just corporate customers, but from 1 December 1998, when the Irish telecommunications market was fully deregulated, domestic customers were also targeted, under the Esat Clear brand name. 1,300 customers signed up before it had even launched. In 1999, Esat entered the Internet service provider market, initially through the purchase of EUnet Ireland, which became Esat Net. However, it was the acquisition of Ireland On-Line from An Post that year which made Esat the biggest ISP in the country for a time. Also in 1999, Esat bid for Cablelink Limited, the cable and television company owned jointly by Telecom Éireann and RTÉ. However, NTL won.

In 1999, Esat Telecom was the first wholly owned Irish company to lay two optical submarine cables between Ireland and the UK. No other company had achieved such a milestone and since then, only operators from outside the state have managed to install their own optical submarine cables.

=== Esat BT ===
In 1999, relations became tense between Esat and Telenor over how Esat Digifone, their mobile joint venture, should be operated. Telenor tried to remove Denis O'Brien as chairman of Esat Digifone and remove the Esat name from the company. Esat for its part retaliated by threatening to sue Telenor, and making repeated offers to buy the Norwegian company out. Eventually, in November 1999, Telenor bid for the entire share capital of Esat Telecom Group plc as a way of solving the situation. The bid was rejected by the Esat board and so became a hostile takeover attempt. To defend this, in January 2000, British Telecommunications plc (now BT Group plc) made a friendly takeover offer for the company which was backed by the Esat board. Esat became a wholly owned subsidiary of BT and was delisted from the stock market.

When BT acquired Esat, they began integrating the business along with its Northern Ireland subsidiary, BT (NI). The combined unit was then registered as BT Communications (Ireland) Limited.

The company's main business is in fixed line telecommunications where it owns its own network in Northern Ireland and owns a network built along the Iarnród Éireann rail network in the Republic of Ireland and along the road which complements its rail network. The network build phase started in August 1997 and it also leases capacity from its fixed line incumbent, Eircom.

Following the company's acquisition by BT, Esat Telecom was rebranded as Esat BT in 2002, and replaced its own logo with the BT piper.

=== BT Ireland ===
In late 2004, it was announced from April 2005, the name of the company would change from "Esat BT" to just "BT Ireland".

All company names in the Esat BT Group were officially re-registered with the Companies Registration Office as BT in March 2005, and on 12 April, the company was officially rebranded as "BT Ireland".

On 22 July 2009, BT Ireland agreed to transfer most of its consumer and small business operations in Ireland, other than its remaining dial-up internet operations, to Vodafone Ireland. Large industrial and commercial customers will remain with BT. Under the partnership, Vodafone will provide voice and broadband internet services over BT's network. The deal was subject to the Competition Authority's approval, which was approved in August 2009.

BT Ireland do not own any infrastructure in Northern Ireland, being owned by BT Group (UK) directly.

In 2025, BT Communications Ireland was sold to Speed Fibre Group, and now operate as Enet Communications Limited.

== Esat Digifone ==
Esat Digifone, a GSM mobile phone network which was the first competitor to Eircell (then a Telecom Éireann subsidiary) was originally a joint venture between Esat Telecom and Telenor, however when Esat was sold to BT, the mobile division became part of BT Wireless, which was eventually spun off as O2 plc, which in turn was bought by Spanish-based Telefónica in 2005 (EU approved in 2006). The company is now officially registered as Telefónica O2 Ireland Limited, but trades as O_{2}. In June 2013, Hutchison Whampoa announced it would acquire the Irish arm of O2 for €780m. O2 is now merged with Hutchison Whampoa's subsidiary Three Ireland following the completion of the sale.

== See also ==
- List of Irish companies
- Communications in Ireland
- BT Young Scientist and Technology Exhibition
