= Eircell =

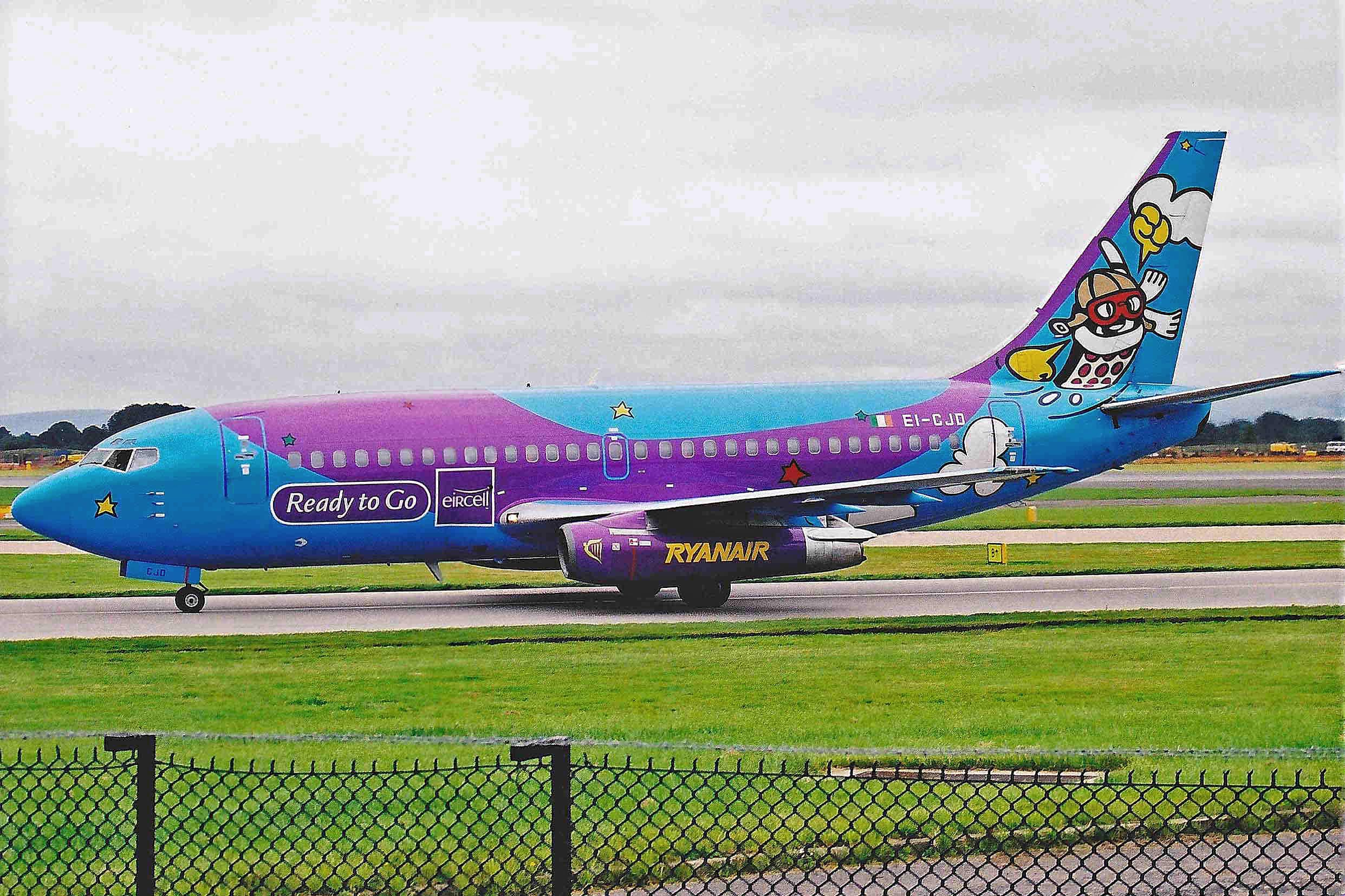
- A Ryanair Boeing 737-200 aircraft in Eircell livery in 2000
- Type: former: State-owned company
- Industry: Telecommunications
- Founded: 1984; 42 years ago in Dublin, Ireland
- Founder: Telecom Eireann
- Defunct: 2001
- Fate: Acquired by Vodafone
- Area served: Ireland
- Website: eircell.ie

Eircell was an Irish mobile cellular network provider which was established in 1984, with operations commencing in 1986. Its access code was 088 for the original analogue TACS system and 087 for the later GSM system. Following the abolition of the Department of Posts and Telegraphs, Eircell fell under the remit of Telecom Éireann (Later Eircom), which today is known as Eir. The Eircell brand became defunct in 2002 following its acquisition by Vodafone. From 2001, Eircell underwent a major branding exercise after its acquisition by the Vodafone group in December 2000. The main branding was to associate a shade of deep purple with the company. When Vodafone rebranded with its trademark shade of red, the company commented that "red is the new purple". The company was known as Eircell-Vodafone for some time as the process took nine months in total.

== History ==
=== Early stages of Eircell ===
In the late 1980s, early adopters of the service numbered in their hundreds rather than thousands and paid handsomely for the phones that were available at the time through a network of independent retailers. The price for mobile phones ranged from IR£1500 to IR£2000 and 'subscribers' were typically politicians or wealthy businessmen. The market-leading phone manufacturers in the early years of the Irish market were Nokia and Motorola.

=== Popularity of the company rises ===
In response to negative publicity about security compromises on the TACS system during the early 1990s, Eircell introduced Ireland's first encrypted cellular phone called a Kokusai and it retailed in the region of IR£1400. Sales were poor partly because Eircell was not in the business of selling phones and because switching from encrypted to unencrypted was 'messy'. As phone prices dropped and the network rolled out to more of Ireland, sales took off reaching a milestone 100,000 subscribers by 1995.

In 1997, Eircell launched Ireland's first prepaid mobile phone service which was called 'Ready To Go'l, initially only on the 088 Analogue service. A year later, it launched its GSM 900 version (access code 087) which quickly took hold as users rapidly switched over to the new digital technology.

== See also ==
- Communications in Ireland
- Vodafone Ireland
