= Telecom Éireann =

Irish telecommunications company active from 1983 to 1999

- Type: State owned company
- Industry: Telecommunications
- Founded: 1983; 43 years ago
- Fate: Privatised
- Successor: eircom
- Headquarters: Ardilaun Hall, St Stephen's Green, Dublin, Ireland
- Area served: Ireland
- Products: Landline, Analog and digital cable (Cable television, Cable radio, Cable Internet, Cable telephony)
- Revenue: IR£788 million 1993
- Number of employees: 13,100
- Divisions: Eircell

Telecom Éireann (Irish pronunciation: [ˈtʲɛlʲəkəmˠ ˈeːɾʲən̪ˠ]; meaning "Telecommunications of Ireland") was an Irish state-owned telecommunications company established by the Postal and Telecommunications Services Act, 1983, that operated from 1983 to 1999. Prior to then a telephone and postal service was provided by the Department of Posts and Telegraphs (known as "P and T" or "P⁊T" in Gaelic script), as part of the civil service. Its full formal title was "Bord Telecom Éireann or, in the English language, The Irish Telecommunications Board". (Note: "Postal and Telecommunications Services Act, 1983". Irish Statute Book. Section 10(1)(b). "Bord Telecom Éireann" is misspelled "Board Telecom Éireann" in the relevant clause in the online text; it is spelled correctly in the printed text and elsewhere in the online text.) "Telecom Éireann" may be translated as "Telecom of Ireland". In 1999, the company was privatised and renamed as eircom.

== Upgrading the network ==
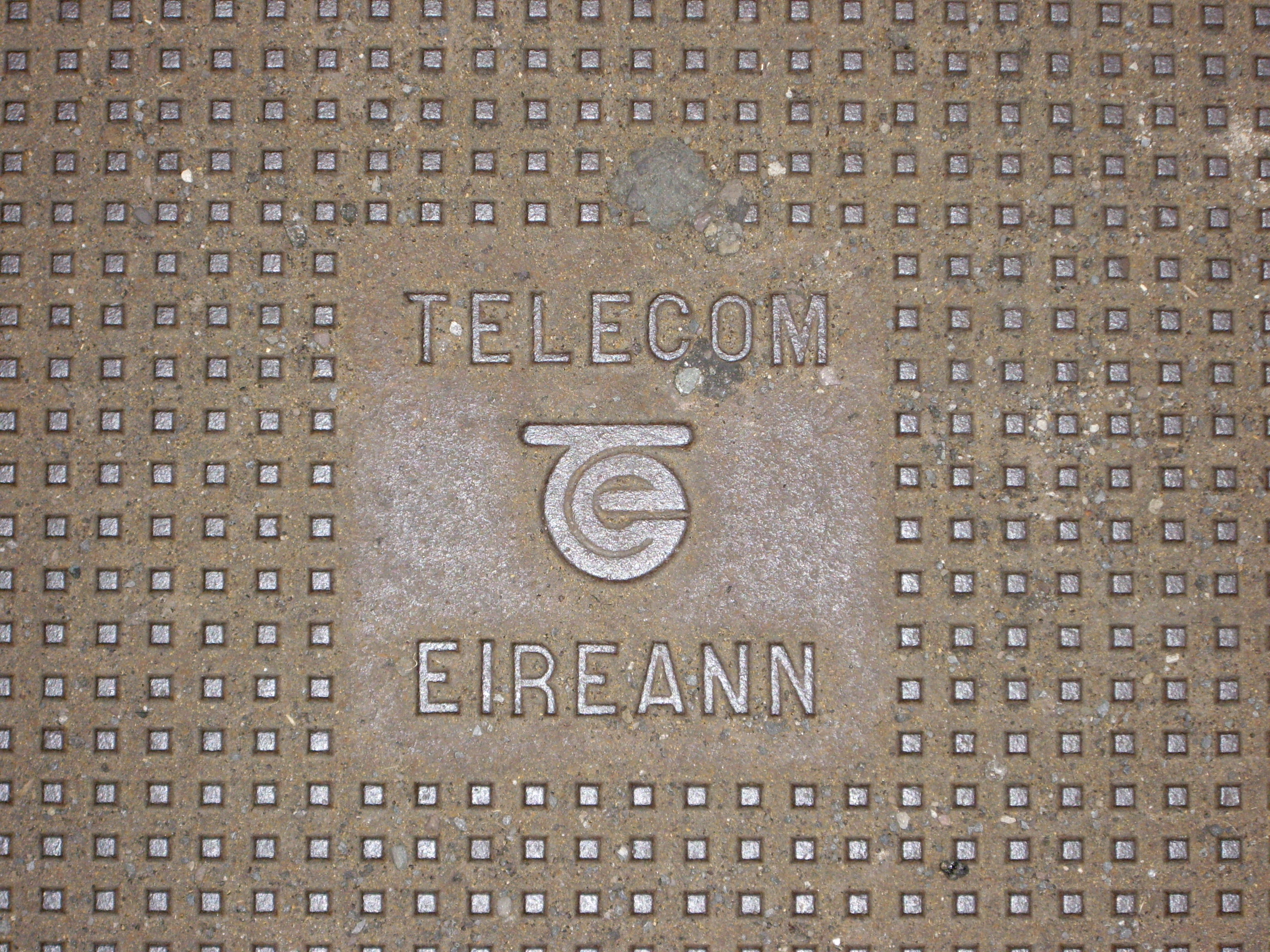
A manhole cover photographed in 2009, dating from the Telecom Éireann network upgrade.

Telecom Éireann rolled out digital telephone switching technology, across the country along with an extensive fibre optic and digital microwave backbone. Digital technology quickly replaced analogue systems at national and major regional switching centres and new international gateway switches were installed. Two digital switching systems were selected; CIT-Alcatel's E10 and Ericsson's AXE telephone exchange. The oldest electromechanical step-by-step exchanges and manual operator-manned local exchanges were the first to be converted to digital technology. More modern electromechanical crossbar exchanges, using Ericsson ARF, Hitachi and ITT Pentaconta technology dating from the 1960s and 1970s were converted to digital bit by bit through the late 1980s and early 1990s. These crossbar switches were capable of providing voice service that was comparable to digital switching technology.

By the early 1990s, the Irish network was amongst the most modern and most digitalised in the world and by the mid-1990s and had become 100% digitally switched.

In June 1996, a strategic alliance was formed between Telecom Éireann of Ireland, Telia of Sweden and KPN of the Netherlands, after both companies purchased a combined 35 percent stake in Telcom Éireann. The alliance was completed by 2001, when Telia and KPN exited Ireland. During the time of the alliance it was headquartered in St Stephens Green and Harcourt Street, Dublin.

The company also did a major upgrade to the payphone network in the late 1980s, which saw the rollout of smart card based payphones across Ireland. The Telecom Éireann CallCard was one of the earliest implementations chip-based cards in the world.

== Eircell ==
Telecom Éireann launched Eircell (now Vodafone Ireland) in 1984, with operations commencing in 1986. The company deployed a national mobile telephone network based on a first generation mobile technology known as the Total Access Communication System, or TACS for short. This technology, similar to AMPS, was also used in the UK by Vodafone and Cellnet. Eircell launched their digital network based on GSM technology from Ericsson in 1993. GSM service rapidly replaced the TACS network as customers migrated over to new digital technology. Within a few years, the TACS network was obsolete and taken off air.

== Other divisions ==
- Minitel Ireland (joint venture)

The company launched Minitel videotext system in Ireland in 1991 in a joint venture with France Telecom, AIB and Crédit Lyonnais. The system went live after 3 years of trials and development but due to poor uptake, probably due to its relatively late launch that coincided with the beginning of the Web, a more flexible system with a vast array of English-language content, it quickly faded from public attention. The Irish Minitel system had been planned as early as 1988 and envisioned building an ecosystem similar to its French counterpart, with shopping, banking and information services. Minitel Ireland was ultimately shut down due a small and dwindling user base.

- Telecom Internet

In 1997, Telecom Éireann established Telecom Internet also known as Tinet, the Internet service provider the company rapidly became one of the partners in the Internet Neutral Exchange and is today known as eircom net.

- Eirpage

Telecom Éireann established Eirpage, a national paging system in Ireland.

This system was then controlled and operated by Voxpro Communications, formerly Pageboy (www.voxpro.ie) until the closure of the National Paging System in August 2011.

- Eirpac

Launched in 1984 to replace Euronet, Eirpac is the Irish public switched data network supporting X.25 and X.28

- TEIS (Telecom Éireann Information Systems)

This unit sold business systems and office telephone systems to business customers.

- TeleCentre – this was Telecom Éireann's retail arm, which was later renamed eircom Store and then shut down as eircom moved away from physical customer contact centres. Since the closure of the stores, customers can only contact eircom online or by telephone.
- Phonewatch – Provides monitored alarm services to both residential and business customers. The company was rebranded as eircom PhoneWatch. It is one of the largest players in the Irish home security market and was sold to a Norwegian company in 2012.

== Support ==
In 1988, it sponsored RTÉ Weather until 1999.

== Privatisation ==
Telecom Éireann was privatised in 1999 and renamed as eircom plc. It was later split into Eircell 2000 plc (Eircell), the mobile networks business, and eircom, the fixed-line business which also inherited other minor divisions, such as the Eirpage pager system and the Telecom retail arm. Eircell was sold to Vodafone in May 2001, and later changed its name to the dual-brand Eircell Vodafone before becoming Vodafone Ireland.

== See also ==
- Communications in Ireland

== Popular culture ==
In the BBC TV series Coupling, a phone with a Telecom Éireann logo appears in the episode "Gotcha". In the Channel 4 Series Father Ted(Speed 3) a Telecom Éireann kiosk is seen near the end.
