= Vodafone Ireland =

Irish telecommunication company

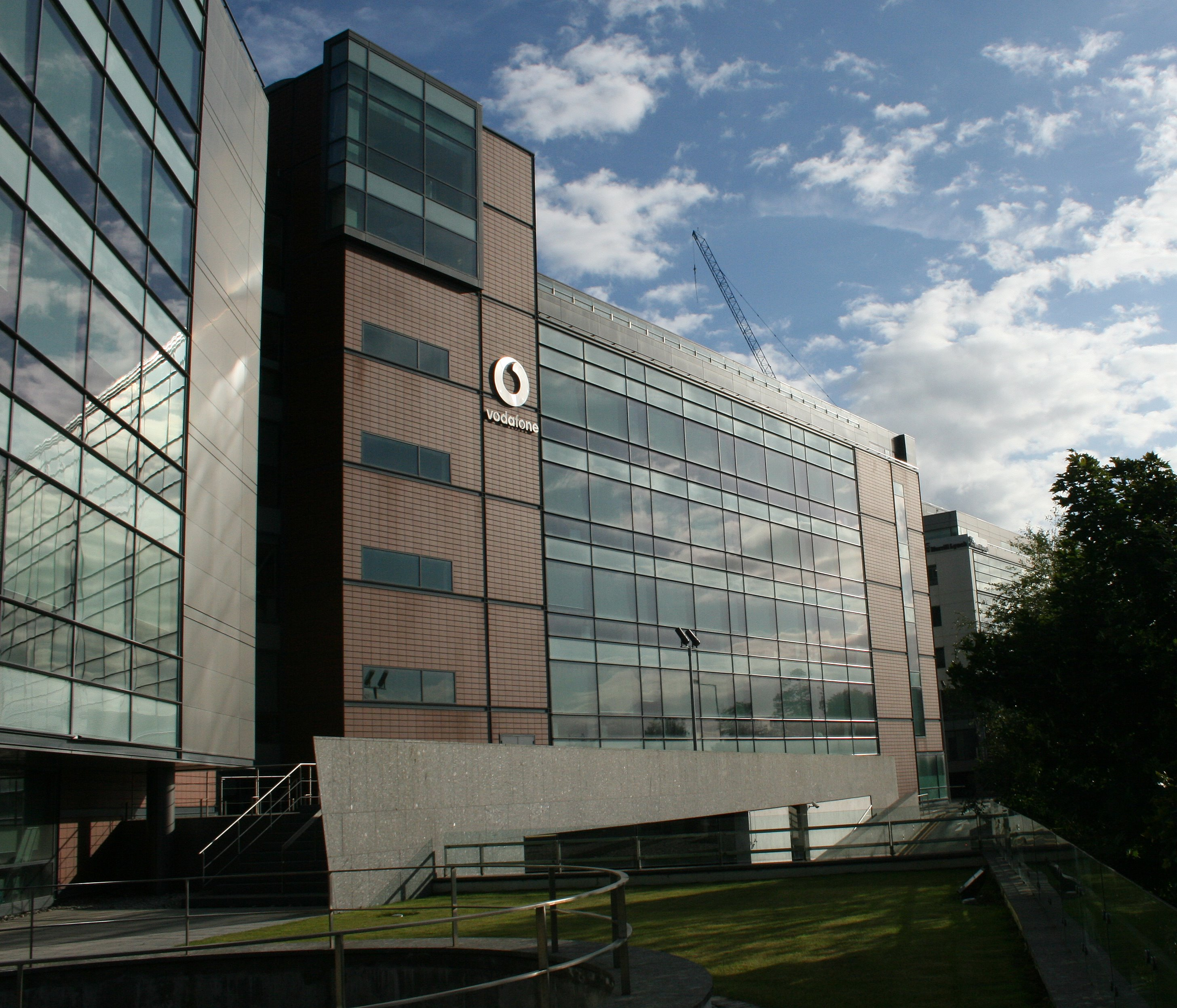
- Vodafone Ireland Headquarters in Leopardstown, Dublin
- Formerly: Eircell
- Type: Subsidiary
- Industry: Mobile; Telecommunication
- Founded: 1984; 42 years ago (as Eircell); 8 May 2001; 25 years ago (as Vodafone Ireland)
- Headquarters: MountainView, Leopardstown, Dublin 18; D18 XN97
- Area served: Ireland
- Key people: Amanda Nelson (CEO)
- Products: Mobile network, telecom services
- Brands: Vodafone Smart
- Parent: Vodafone Group
- Website: vodafone.ie

Vodafone Ireland Limited, a wholly owned subsidiary of Vodafone Group, is a mobile phone network, broadband and TV provider in Ireland. It was created when the Vodafone Group bought Eircell, the mobile arm of Telecom Éireann. As of September 2019, Vodafone has 26% of broadband subscribers (including 40% of fibre to the premises subscribers), and 43% of mobile phone subscribers.

The company operates a full range of voice, SMS, MMS and mobile data services using a 2G GSM 900/1800 network and a 3G UMTS 900/2100 network capable of offering a range of broadband services including DC-HSPA+ which can deliver up to a theoretical 43.2 Mbit/s. Their 4G network was launched in October 2013. Vodafone claims over 99% of the island of Ireland is covered by their 4G network within the Republic. Vodafone 4G operates on the 800/1800 network offering speeds of up to 75 Mbit/s. They have also built a new kind of 4G called 4G+ which enables speeds of 225 Mbit/s on devices that support this and the initial roll out of this service was in major towns and cities first becoming more widespread over time. Vodafone 4G is available to over 6 cities and 500 towns in Ireland making Vodafone the strongest and most widespread 4G service offered in the country. Their 5G service was launched in 2019.

Vodafone Ireland offers a full range of contract (bill pay) and prepay services, including mobile telephony and mobile broadband.

The company also offers a range of fixed-line services including traditional telephone services, ADSL2+, FTTC (VDSL2) and FTTH high speed broadband. These services are delivered using SIRO, Open Eir, and NBI's wholesale access networks with Vodafone's own back-haul capacity. In some areas, Vodafone has made use of local-loop unbundling (LLU) and has its own equipment in the local exchange operated in partnership with BT Ireland. Numbers issued by Vodafone Ireland usually start with 087 (+353 87), however full number portability is in use in Ireland so the mobile prefix is not a reliable indicator of which network the number is hosted on.

== Eircell ==
Eircell commenced operation in 1986 as the Mobile and Broadcast division of Telecom Éireann. The GSM network went live in July 1993. Eircell handled the Irish mobile phone networks defined by the access codes 088 (analogue TACS system) and 087 (digital GSM 900 system) from 1984 until its transfer to Vodafone in 2001. Usage of the service remained low until it became a separate subsidiary, Eircell Limited, in 1997.

In October 1997, Eircell introduced the analogue prepaid pay as you go system under the Ready To Go brand, and turned mobile communications in Ireland into a mass-market product. From early 1997 Eircell faced competition from Esat Digifone, then a joint venture between Denis O'Brien's Esat Telecom Group and Telenor of Norway. In 2000, Vodafone made an offer for the company to Eircell's parent, Eircom, which saw the company demerge from Eircom plc into a separate plc, Eircell 2000 plc (trading name: Eircell Vodafone), which was then acquired by Vodafone. In 2002, Eircell Vodafone was rebranded as Vodafone Ireland.

In 2001, Eircell closed down its original analogue TACS (088) system, and Vodafone Ireland now operates a purely digital (GSM/UMTS) network.

=== Rebranding ===
Vodafone saw Eircell undergo a major rebranding exercise on its acquisition by the group. The main rebranding was to associate a shade of deep purple with the company. When Vodafone rebranded with their trademark shade of red, the tagline used was "Red is the new purple, Vodafone is the new name for Eircell".

Vodafone Ireland introduced UMTS services (branded "Vodafone live! with 3G") in 2004, launching the first handsets in November. This meant they were ahead of O2 Ireland and new entrant Three Ireland in launching third-generation services. Mobile network Meteor is rolling out their own 3G/UMTS network, having been awarded the last Irish UMTS licence. Initially restricted to contract ('bill pay') customers, Vodafone extended UMTS to pre-pay 'Ready To Go' customers from 2 June 2005.

== Criticism ==
Analysis by the Sunday Independent in January 2006 showed the massive margins being earned by Vodafone and O2 in the country are costing Irish mobile phone users about €300m a year. If the mobile phone companies were to cut their Irish margins to the group average, Vodafone customers would see their annual bills falling by an average of €80.47 (€6.71 a month)

The European Commission upheld a ruling by the Irish regulatory body, Comreg, that the Irish mobile phone market needed greater competition, and acknowledged that "tacit collusion possibly existed between O2 and Vodafone".

A senior manager at Vodafone Ireland in March 2007 was dismissed following allegations that he defrauded the mobile operator of more than €1m. The company added in a statement: "As the matter is subject to legal proceedings, Vodafone cannot comment further."

The National Parents Council criticised mobile phone companies for the lack of information available about filtering. The Sunday Tribune tested access to four separate sites – a pornography site, an Irish escort site, a pro-anorexia site and a prosuicide site – on the mobile phone networks Vodafone, O2, 3 and Meteor. All four networks allowed access.

In January 2009 it was revealed that Ireland was nearly the most profitable market in the world for multinational mobile operators like Vodafone. In April 2009, the company admitted to overcharging 100,000 of its Irish customers a total of €900,000 by incorrectly billing them. In August 2010, it was revealed that the Irish exchequer was facing a demand from the company for a substantial corporation tax refund after it agreed that tax paid in Ireland should have been paid in Britain. The Vodafone subsidiary in question had profits of over €200 million but just 20 employees. In March 2011, Vodafone pleaded guilty to four breaches of the Data Protection Act at the Dublin District Court. Vodafone admitted in June 2012 it had not returned more than half of the €1.9m it overcharged customers and there was little likelihood the remainder would be returned. ComReg said it was monitoring Vodafone's provision of refunds to affected consumers.

The Department of Justice advised Vodafone publishing details of data requested by the Gardaí and other Irish authorities might compromise national security and hinder the investigation of serious criminal activity but it subsequently published the data.

Vodafone has a long-standing relationship with Amdocs, a large software and services company founded in Israel that has been repeatedly accused of espionage, including in the US. In 2024, Vodafone implemented the Amdocs BSS/OSS platform that processes mobile and fixed service usage data.

== Perlico ==
On 13 November 2007, Vodafone Ireland announced the acquisition of Perlico, a small fixed line phone and broadband services reseller for €80m. This was in line with the strategy of other Vodafone companies across Europe, in buying small fixed-line providers for potential offerings of future converged services. As a result of the acquisition, Perlico was dissolved after the merger, having become a wholly owned subsidiary of Vodafone Ireland.

== Acquisition of BT customers ==
On 22 July 2009, BT Ireland agreed to transfer its consumer voice, broadband data and small business operations in Ireland to Vodafone, leap-frogging the company into a leading role as a fixed-line broadband operator in the country. Under the terms of the deal Vodafone leased capacity on BT's fixed line network for the services.

== See also ==
- List of companies of Ireland
