= Three Ireland =

Telecommunications provider in Ireland

- Native name: Three Ireland (Hutchison) Limited
- Formerly: Hutchison 3G Ireland Limited
- Type: Subsidiary
- Industry: Telecommunications
- Founded: 26 July 2005; 21 years ago
- Founder: Hutchison Whampoa
- Headquarters: 28/29 Sir John Rogerson's Quay, Dublin 2, D02 EY80, Ireland
- Area served: Ireland
- Key people: Elaine Carey (CEO)
- Products: Mobile telephony; Broadband Internet
- Brands: 48 Mobile
- Owner: 3 Group Europe
- Parent: CK Hutchison Holdings
- Website: www.three.ie

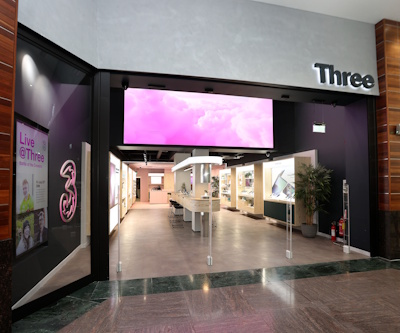
Three flagship store, Dundrum Town Centre

Three Ireland (Hutchison) Limited (formerly Hutchison 3G Ireland Limited), commonly known as 3 Ireland or Three Ireland, is a telecommunications and internet service provider operating in Ireland as a subsidiary of CK Hutchison Holdings, operating under the global Three brand. The company launched in July 2005 and provides 2G GSM, 3G UMTS, 4G LTE and 5G NR mobile phone services. Three's former holding company, Hutchison Whampoa, acquired O2 Ireland in June 2013, and the company was fully merged into the operations of Three Ireland in March 2015. Three is Ireland’s largest mobile telecommunications provider, with 49.7% market share overall, and 27.6% market share with mobile broadband and M2M services excluded.

== History ==
Three launched on 26 July 2005 as Ireland's fourth mobile network operator behind Vodafone, O2 and Meteor (now Eir). Service was initially offered as post-paid only, but on 16 May 2006 the introduction of a pre-paid service, known as 3Pay, was announced. A pre-paid mobile broadband service was launched on 29 February 2008 under the name 3Pay Broadband, with vouchers available for durations of one day, one week, or one month. On 13 May 2010, Three announced the launch of the world's first commercial voice and data I-HSPA network.

In August 2010, Three Ireland admitted it had been overstating its subscriber numbers since 2006. As per its latest released mid year statements about 56 per cent of Three's 554,000 registered subscribers are considered active. This is about 244,000 short of the figure supplied to ComReg.

On 24 June 2013, it was announced that Hutchison would acquire Telefónica's Irish mobile operations, O2 for €780 million, to be merged into Three Ireland upon completion of the deal. The European Commission approved the merger in 2014. The O2 brand was phased out and its operations fully merged into Three on 2 March 2015.

Three employs over 1,200 people across its head office in Dublin, customer experience centre in Limerick, and 65 stores around Ireland.

== Network ==
Three has a licence for operation in Ireland using the access code 083, although numbers can be ported over from other networks.

Three's original infrastructure was purely 3G. For a while, they provided 2G coverage (a) under a partnership with Vodafone, and (b) through the acquisition of O2 Ireland's 2G network in 2015, however, roaming on Vodafone is no longer supported, and 2G is natively supported with the acquisition of O2 and its 3G & 2G networks.

In July 2012, Three Ireland announced a strategic partnership with Vodafone Ireland to share network infrastructure. This would have facilitated rapid rollout of Three's 4G network, while also making it less costly. The agreement was terminated following the O2 merger.

In April 2019, Three launched a partnership with Arranmore off the coast of Donegal to create a more connected island. This partnership was established to help the local community of Arranmore to create businesses and employment opportunities by providing connectivity and bandwidth.

=== 4G ===
In November 2012, Three was awarded LTE spectrum by auction, along with the three other incumbent network operators.

On 27 January 2014, Three launched their 4G network in Dublin, Cork, Galway, Limerick, Wexford and Waterford. In March 2014, Three expanded their 4G coverage to Ashbourne, Bray, Carlow, Dunmore East, Kilkenny, Leixlip, Lusk, Rush, Skerries, Swords and Tullamore.

In March 2016, Three Ireland announced that it is now offering Free 4G for Life to all its customers. Previously, Three offered free 4G to all its customers up to a certain date at which point the company would review and possibly extend that date further.

Three's upgrade programme "the big upgrade" aimed to provide 99% 4G coverage by early 2017. 4G coverage currently sits at 99% as of May 2026.

=== 4G+/LTE Advanced ===
Three have announced they will be rolling out 4G+ to their customers offering faster Peak Speeds of 225 Mbit/s. Three say 4G+ is already available in Dublin and will be rolled out to the rest of the State by the end of April 2016. Three are offering 4G+ to all Customers with compatible handsets.

Three was named Ireland's fastest mobile network by Ookla for Q3–Q4 2020, with an average download speed of 33.99 Mbit/s.

=== 5G ===
In September 2020, Three launched their new 5G network. Over time, Three has grown the service from being available in 121 locations to providing over 97% population coverage of 5G. In January 2026, OpenSignal named Three as the best network for reliability, consistent quality, and both download and upload speeds.

=== Network frequencies ===
The following is a list of known frequencies used by Three Ireland:

| Frequency | Band | Protocol | Class |
|---|---|---|---|
| 900 MHz | GSM-900 | GSM/GPRS/EDGE | 2G |
| 900 MHz | 8 | UMTS/HSPA/HSPA+ | 3G |
| 700 MHz | 28 | LTE/LTE Advanced | 4G/4G+ |
| 800 MHz | 20 | LTE/LTE Advanced | 4G/4G+ |
| 1800 MHz | 3 | LTE/LTE Advanced | 4G/4G+ |
| 2100 MHz | 1 | LTE/LTE Advanced | 4G/4G+ |
| 2600 MHz | 7 | LTE/LTE Advanced | 4G/4G+ |
| 1800 MHz | n3 | NR | 5G |

== Sponsorships ==
On 5 August 2010, Three Ireland announced a four-year, €7,500,000 deal with the Football Association of Ireland to become the primary sponsor of all Republic of Ireland international football teams. In 2015, Three renewed the sponsorship for a further five years.

They have also sponsored the Irish rugby team from 2014 until 2016 and Waterford GAA's teams from 2010 to 2017. In 2020, Three UK and Ireland became a sponsor of Chelsea Football Club, supporting the men’s, women’s and academy teams, as well as the Chelsea Foundation.

Following Hutchison Whampoa's acquisition of O2 Ireland, The O2 was renamed 3Arena in 2014 and the company have continued to sponsor the venue since then. Three have also sponsored the 3Olympia Theatre since September 2021 and the music festival Electric Picnic since 2015.

== 48 ==
In 2012, O2 Ireland launched a youth focused MVNO called 48. The value proposition for the brand has been offering unlimited call, text and data for a low fixed monthly price.

== See also ==
- 3 (telecommunications)
- 3Arena
- 3Olympia Theatre
