= Telephone numbers in the Republic of Ireland =

Telephone numbers in Ireland
- Telephone Dialling Codes in Ireland
- Country: Ireland
- Continent: Europe
- Regulator: ComReg
- Numbering plan type: Open
- NSN length: 7–9
- Format: various, see text
- Country code: +353
- International access: 00
- Long-distance: 0

Numbers on the Irish telephone numbering plan are regulated and assigned to operators by ComReg.

== Overview ==
Telephone numbers in Ireland are part of an open numbering plan that allows variations in number length. The Irish format is similar to systems used in many parts of Europe, notably the Netherlands, Sweden, Germany, Belgium and France, where geographical numbers are organised using a logic of large regional prefixes, which are then further subdivided into smaller regions. It differs from UK numbering, which originated as alphanumeric codes based on town names.

Irish Mobile and non–geographic numbers are fixed length and do not support local dialling.

The trunk prefix 0 is used to access numbers outside the local area and for all mobile calls. This is followed by an area code, referred to as a National Dialling Code (NDC), the first digit of which indicates the geographical area or type of service (e.g. mobile).

Calls made from mobile phones and some VoIP systems always require the full area code and phone number.

In common with most European countries, the trunk prefix 0 must be omitted when calling Irish numbers from abroad.

=== General structure of Irish numbering ===
Irish area codes vary in length, between one and three digits (excluding the leading 0), and subscribers' numbers are between five and seven digits.

As optional local dialling is facilitated, Irish geographic numbers cannot begin with 0 (trunk prefix), 1 (special number prefix) or 999 (emergency services). However, mobile numbers use the full range of digits, as local dialling is not supported on mobile networks, and the area code must always be dialled.

A migration to a standard format, 0xx xxx xxxx, is in progress; however, to avoid disruption, this process is only being carried out as needed, where existing area codes and local numbering systems have reached full capacity. There is currently no plan to move to a closed numbering system.

=== Number formats ===
Irish geographic numbers vary in length from area to area, but follow standard formats within each area code.

The area code, or prefix, is normally separated by a space, or less commonly, may be displayed in parentheses (brackets). Numbers are usually grouped into easy to read clusters, separated by spaces or hyphens for ease of use.

The use of spaces is recommended by ComReg for ease of compatibility with online services, such as linking to a phone number in a mobile browser, copying and pasting into mobile diallers etc

Other characters, such as / or . are not used as separators.

Area codes / prefixes are always separated from the subscriber number. Merging or reformatting these tends to cause confusion or make numbers look unfamiliar.

While formats vary, numbers are usually printed (e.g. in telephone directories) as follows:

Geographic:

- 01 XXX XXXX – Dublin area
- 0XX XXX XXXX – All other 7-digit areas
- 0XX XXX XXX – 6-digit areas
- 0XX XXXXX – 5-digit areas
- 0X0X XXXXX – 5-digit areas

Non-geographic

- 1800 XXX XXX – Freephone/Toll Free
- 0818 XXX XXX – Standard Rate

Mobile

- 08X XXX XXXX

Mobile M2M (Machine to Machine)

- 088 XXXXX XXXXX

Alphanumeric dialling, using letters as mnemonics for advertising etc is supported, but is rarely used.

==== Geographical numbering ====
Irish geographical numbering is structured on a regional basis and follows a logical hierarchy.

These directory areas correspond approximately to the following geographical regions:

- 01 – Greater Dublin Area
- 02 – Cork
- 04 – Northeast
- 05 – Southeast
- 06 – Midwest and Southwest
- 07 – Northwest
- 09 – West

The Midlands is covered by several regional codes.

Except for the 01 area, each area is further subdivided into smaller areas (NDCs). Usually, the main city or town in the area is 0x1 e.g. 021 (Cork), 061 (Limerick), 091 (Galway).

==== Regional overview ====
Directory area	National Dialling Codes (NDCs)	Region and cities / towns
01	01 – single NDC for entire region	Dublin area: extends to certain parts of Wicklow, Meath and Kildare.
02	021 to 029	Cork area: 021: Metropolitan Cork; 022: Mallow; 023: Bandon; 024: Youghal; 025: Fermoy; 026: Macroom; 027: Bantry; 028: Skibbereen; 029: Kanturk
04	0402, 0404, 041 to 047 and 049	Northeast and Midlands: 0402: Arklow; 0404: Wicklow; 041: Drogheda; 042: Dundalk and Carrickmacross; 043: Longford; 044: Mullingar; 045: Newbridge and Naas; 046: Navan and Edenderry; 047: Monaghan; 049: Cavan and Oldcastle
05	0504, 0505, 051 to 053, 056 to 059	Midlands and Southeast: 0504: Thurles; 0505: Roscrea; 051: Waterford, New Ross and Carrick–on–Suir; 052: Clonmel; 053: Wexford; 056: Kilkenny; 057: Portlaoise and Tullamore; 058: Dungarvan; 059: Carlow, Athy and Baltinglass
06	061 to 069	Midwest and Southwest: 061: Limerick, Shannon and Scarriff; 062: Tipperary; 063: Charleville; 064: Killarney; 065: Ennis; 066: Tralee; 067: Nenagh; 068: Listowel; 069: Newcastle West
07	071 and 074	Northwest: 071: Sligo and Carrick–on–Shannon; 074: Letterkenny
09	090, 091, 093 to 099	West and Midlands: 090: Athlone, Ballinasloe and Roscommon; 091: Galway; 093: Tuam; 094: Castlebar and Castlerea; 095: Clifden; 096: Ballina; 097: Belmullet; 098: Westport; 099: Kilronan

ComReg maintains a map of area codes here.

=== Mobile services ===
Mobile phone numbers start with the prefix 08x and are part of a closed numbering plan, which means that a mobile phone number must have 10 digits. Calls to landlines and other mobiles require the area code on a mobile phone.

New numbers are assigned on prefixes and ranges managed by a specific operator. However, as full mobile number portability has been in operation since 2003, it is no longer possible to reliably identify which network a particular number is on. For example, a newly assigned Three number would begin with 083, but may have been ported to another operator in the meantime.

=== Mobile network operators (MNOs) ===
NDC	Network	Notes
083 and 086	Three Ireland	086 previously belonged to O_{2}, formerly Digifone, formerly Esat.
085	eir mobile	previously known as Meteor and eMobile
087	Vodafone Ireland	formerly Eircell

=== Mobile virtual network operators (MVNOs) ===
NDC	Network	Notes
083	BlueFace (defunct)	Hosted on Three
085	GoMo	Hosted on eir
085	Lidl Connect	Hosted on eir. Voicemail number is 089 909 9505
087	An Post Mobile	Hosted on Vodafone
087	Clear Mobile	Hosted on Vodafone
087	Just Mobile (defunct)	Hosted on Vodafone
089	48	Hosted on Three. Numbers begin with 2 and 4
089	Tesco Mobile	Hosted on Three. Numbers begin with 2 and 4
089	iD Mobile (defunct)	Hosted on Three. Numbers begin with 70 and 71
089	Lycamobile	Hosted on eir. Numbers begin with 94 through 98
089	Sky Mobile	Hosted on Vodafone. Numbers begin with 65 through 67
089	Virgin Mobile	Hosted on Three. Numbers begin with 60 through 62

==== M2M (Machine to Machine) Communication ====
NDC	Network	Notes
088	All networks	Reserved for machine-to-machine (M2M) communications, using the format 088 xxxxx xxxxx. This prefix was originally used for the Eircell TACS network active from 1985 to 2001.

=== Direct to voicemail number ===
Mobile phone numbers also have their own voicemail number. To access this, the number 5 should be put after the prefix. For example, the mobile number 08x xxx xxxx has the voicemail number 08x 5 xxx xxxx.

On some networks, when the direct to voicemail number is called, the voicemail greeting for that network is played (e.g. Vodafone, eir Mobile), while others request a phone number followed by the voicemail greeting for that number (e.g. Three). Users can press the hash key (#) to gain access to the voicemail box.

== Calls to Northern Ireland ==
Although Northern Ireland is part of the UK numbering plan, a special arrangement exists for calling Northern Irish landlines from the Republic of Ireland.

Calls to Northern Ireland can be dialled using the 048 prefix or by dialling the number in the full international format. Most Irish operators treat calls to Northern Ireland at national or even local rates. Similar charging arrangements apply when calling the Republic of Ireland from Northern Ireland.

For example, to reach Belfast landline 90xx xxxx, subscribers can dial either 048 90xx xxxx or 00 44 28 90xx xxxx.

Northern Ireland mobile phones use the same mobile numbering and networks as other parts of the UK – calls must be dialled using the 00 44 7xxx xxx xxx format.

The 048 prefix cannot be used as +353 48 xxxx xxxx, as the 048 prefix is a special access code, not an Irish area code. It tells Irish networks to route the remaining eight digits to Northern Ireland’s +44 28 area code. ComReg specifies the valid formats as 048 xxxx xxxx or 00 44 28 xxxx xxxx.

== International calls ==
In common with all EU countries, the international access code is 00.

Numbers should be dialled as follows: 00 – country code – area code – local number.

All mobile phones and some VoIP services also support the international E.164 number format, so a + may be optionally used instead of 00.

== Reserved numbers ==
- 03 – reserved for future changes in the numbering plan
- 07 – all except 0707, 0700, 071, 074 and 076 are reserved without assigned purpose
- 0707 – reserved for personal numbering
- 0800 – reserved

== Special numbers ==
- 00 – international access
- 020 91x xxxx – drama use (although the rest of 020 is free)
- 0700 – personal numbering
- 076 – VoIP services – (being withdrawn.)
- 080 – mailbox for landline users (formerly access code for Northern Ireland)
- 089 011 0xxx – drama use

=== Speed dial short numbers to contact carriers ===
- 1901 – eir
- 1902 – Digiweb
- 1903 – Tesco Mobile
- 1904 – BT Ireland
- 1907 – Vodafone Ireland
- 1908 – Virgin Mobile Ireland
- 1910 – Magnet Networks
- 1913 – Three Ireland
- 1977 – NUACOM Ireland
- 1923 – Lycamobile Ireland

== Operator services ==
General operator assistance no longer exists in Ireland.

- 118xx – Directory enquiries (multiple commercial providers offer a variety of services in this number range)

== Emergency services ==
The emergency number for Ireland is 999. However, the 112 code also accesses the emergency operator. This code is harmonised across the EU. Either can be dialled.

=== Services provided ===
- Ambulance
- Garda Síochána
- Fire and rescue
- Irish Coast Guard
- Cliff and mountain rescue

=== SMS emergency service ===
112 can also be contacted by SMS. While the service is open to all users, it is primarily aimed at the deaf community.

Pre-registration used to be required. Further information can be found at Sending a text to 112.

== Premium rate numbers ==
=== Premium rate voice ===
Irish premium rate telephone numbers start with 15 and are read in two-digit blocks e.g. 1550 is "fifteen fifty".

The rates given below are from ComReg and are indicative only. One must check with their specific telephone service provider for exact rates.

NDC	Maximum price (ComReg)	Notes
1512	€0.50 per call	Premium rate untimed
1513	€0.70 per call	Premium rate untimed
1514	€0.90 per call	Premium rate untimed
1515	€1.20 per call	Premium rate untimed
1516	€1.80 per call	Premium rate untimed
1517	€2.50 per call	Premium rate untimed
1518	€3.50 per call	Premium rate untimed
1520	€0.30 per minute	Premium rate timed
1530	€0.50 per minute	Premium rate timed
1540	€0.70 per minute	Premium rate timed
1550	€1.20 per minute	Premium rate timed
1560	€1.80 per minute	Premium rate timed
1570	€2.50 per minute	Premium rate timed
1580	€2.40 per minute	Premium rate timed
1590	€3.50 per minute	Premium rate timed
1598	€3.50 per minute	Premium rate adult non–live
1599	€3.50 per minute	Premium rate adult live

=== SMS short codes ===
All prices are per SMS.

National Destination Code (NDC)	Price	Notes
50XXX	Free	Some NDCs can be replaced by alphanumeric text to the end-user. (see below)
51XXX	Not exceeding €0.16	Some NDCs can be replaced by alphanumeric text to the end-user. (see below)
53XXX	€0.80	Some NDCs can be replaced by alphanumeric text to the end-user. (see below)
57XXX	€0.80 or above	Some NDCs can be replaced by alphanumeric text to the end-user. (see below)
58XXX	Variable	Some NDCs can be replaced by alphanumeric text to the end-user. (see below)
59XXX	Variable	Some NDCs can be replaced by alphanumeric text to the end-user. (see below)

=== SMS Sender ID Registry ===
On 4 June 2025, the Commission for Communications Regulation (ComReg) launched the SMS Sender ID Registry in Ireland as part of measures to combat SMS phishing (smishing), fraudulent text messages and the impersonation of legitimate organisations. The registry was established to help mobile network operators identify and prevent text messages using unauthorised sender identities from reaching consumers.

The registry primarily concerns alphanumeric SMS Sender IDs, which are identifiers containing letters, such as a business or organisation's name, displayed instead of a telephone number when sending application-to-person (A2P) text messages. For example, an SMS sent using the alphanumeric Sender ID "Three" displays that name as the sender rather than a numerical telephone number. Organisations, including banks, healthcare providers, delivery companies and public services, are required to register the alphanumeric Sender IDs they use with ComReg. Registration may be completed directly by an organisation or by its SMS service provider on its behalf.

The mandatory registration requirement does not generally apply to numerical telephone numbers or SMS short codes. However, holders of certain numerical short codes may register them as Sender IDs. Eligible codes include emergency numbers (112 and 999), customer support codes (19XX), five-digit messaging and payment codes (5XXXX), and harmonised European social service codes (116XXX). Ordinary mobile telephone numbers do not require registration under the scheme.

Alphanumeric Sender IDs must generally contain between three and eleven characters, including at least one letter. Permitted identifiers may contain numbers and certain special characters, but generic names that do not sufficiently identify an organisation are prohibited.

==== Implementation ====
From 3 July 2025, Irish mobile service providers were required to replace unregistered alphanumeric SMS Sender IDs with the warning "Likely Scam" when delivering affected text messages. For example, an organisation attempting to send an SMS using an unregistered alphanumeric sender name would have that name replaced with "Likely Scam" on the recipient's device. This measure was intended to alert recipients that a message might be fraudulent, although legitimate organisations that had not completed registration could also have their messages labelled in this manner.

The warning applies to unregistered alphanumeric Sender IDs, rather than automatically to messages originating from ordinary numerical telephone numbers or short codes. ComReg has also acknowledged that some registered Sender IDs may temporarily be displayed as "Likely Scam" because of technical issues or delays in activation by SMS providers.

ComReg initially planned to introduce the blocking of messages from unregistered Sender IDs on 3 October 2025. However, on 19 September 2025, the regulator announced that the blocking phase would be deferred because of outstanding technical issues affecting some industry participants. The "Likely Scam" labelling requirement remained in operation pending the resolution of these issues. Once blocking is implemented, messages using unregistered alphanumeric Sender IDs will be prevented from reaching recipients rather than being delivered with the warning label.

==== Registration statistics ====
As of 15 October 2026, ComReg reported that 22,092 SMS Sender IDs' had been registered, belonging to 16,301 registered Sender ID owners.

== Non–geographic numbers (Freephone & Standard rate) ==
Irish non-geographic numbers consist of two national prefixes and the international freephone service.

- 0818 – Charged as landline call, and are included in bundled minutes. 6-digit numbers in the format 0818 XXX XXX
- 1800 – Freephone / toll free (from all Irish mobile and landlines. 6-digit numbers in the format 1800 xxx xxx
- 00 800 – Freephone / toll free (from all Irish mobile and landlines. 8-digit numbers in the format 00 800 xxxx xxxx

Where high volume 'bursty traffic' is anticipated, such as on-air radio competition lines, the first two digits of the phone number are always 71. For example: 1800 71x xxx or 0818 71x xxx. This allows the telephone network to manage traffic during number analysis, even before the call is routed.

Ireland's non-geographic numbers and pricing structures were simplified and old shared-cost prefixes were withdrawn on 1 January 2022. These changes mean that calls to non-geographic numbers are either freephone, or always included in call bundles, ensuring consumers are not confused by out of bundle, or other unusual charges.

NDC Prefix	Charging	Description	Notes
1800	Free	National freephone / toll free	Free on all voice services in Ireland. Not reachable outside Ireland.
0818	Timed	Charged as a landline call	Included in call bundles on voice services in Ireland. Called as +353 818 from outside Ireland, incurring a higher cost than a normal call to landline or mobile.
00800	Free	International freephone / toll free	Free on all voice services in Ireland. Can be dialled as +800 in many countries.

Due to the COVID-19 crisis, several HSE numbers in the 1850 and 1890 ranges which were to be withdrawn on 1st Jan 2022 had their service deadline extended to 30 Nov 2023. This was to avoid disruption to essential health services during a time of high volumes of calls. They operated alongside the new numbers that replaced them but advertising of the expiring numbers ceased. Calls to these numbers were charged on the same basis as calls to landlines or 0818 and included in call bundles.

Freephone numbers are free to call from mobile handsets; however, the recipient can elect to refuse mobile–originated calls or choose to accept calls only from predefined geographical region(s).

NB: 1800 can only be dialled from within Ireland. Numbers should never be printed or presented in the international format +353 1800 as these numbers are unreachable. Dialing a number in this format would ordinarily reach a Dublin area number, however Comreg does not assign numbers in the 01 800 xxxx block for this reason. Alternative geographic numbers, or an 0818 number should be used instead, if international access is required.

Following a 2019 review of non–geographic numbers Comreg decided to withdraw and close the 1850, 1890 and 076 number ranges by 1 January 2022. During the transition period, these ranges were geo–rated (charged as if they are geographical numbers).

From August 2019, various telecoms providers announced price changes which took effect on, or just before, 1 December 2019, including Virgin Media Business, in2tel, Virgin Media, eir, Tesco Mobile, Three, Digiweb, Pure Telecom, 48 months, Sky and NUACOM

From 1 January 2022 callers to the withdrawn prefixes receive recorded announcements.

== Internet access numbers ==
- 1891 – reduced cost internet access (possibly timed)
- 1892 – local rate internet access (timed)
- 1893 – variable cost internet access (timed)

== Carrier selection (per call) ==
- 13xxx – carrier selection (third party long distance, international and internet services). These codes override the default carrier.

Carrier preselect is normally used where the exchange automatically uses the customer's preferred provider(s).

== Network engineering codes ==
- 199xxx... – network operator-specific engineering codes (undefined length). These codes are generally not published.

== Line information codes ==
These services give the user more information about their phone line (applicable only to lines provided using the OpenEir access network.)

=== Check phone number associated with line / automatic number announcement circuit (ANAC) ===
- 199000 – reads out the subscriber's telephone number.

=== Check preset carrier ===
Check which carrier a subscriber is using for each category of call:

- 19800 – international calls
- 19822 – local calls
- 19801 – calls to other parts of the Republic of Ireland, Irish mobile numbers and landlines in Northern Ireland.

== Voicemail ==
- 171 – used to access voicemail on all networks: fixed line (POTS and Cable), all mobile operators and many VoIP providers.

== Call management services / supplementary service codes ==
Special short codes are used to control various supplementary services offered by digital local exchanges. These services were first introduced as PhonePlus in 1981, on the first generation of Alcatel E10 and Ericsson AXE digital exchanges used in Ireland, and were rolled out nationally throughout the 1980s.

These services are available on all Irish PSTN lines, regardless of operator. There is a more expansive range of services available, but these are the most commonly used. Different codes apply on cable telephony lines, such as those provided by Virgin Media Ireland and on VoIP providers.

=== PSTN lines and some ISDN services ===
==== Caller ID services ====
- 141 – caller ID default override – withhold caller ID on this call
- 142 – caller ID default override – present caller ID on this call
- 1471 – check last missed call. The system will verbally announce details of the last missed call
- #93# – delete missed call information from network memory

==== Call waiting ====
- *43# – setup
- *#43# – check status
- #43# – cancel

===== Answering call waiting =====
- R0 – reject call (or send to voicemail) and temporarily suspend call waiting service for this call.
- R1 – answer waiting call and disconnect current call.
- R2 – answer waiting call and place current call on hold/or swap between calls.
- R3 – merge both calls into a three–way call.

==== Conference/three–way calling ====
- While on a phone call a subscriber can press the R key on their phone and dial the number they wish to add to the conversation.
- Dial R3 to begin conference/three–way call.
- R2 allows a subscriber to separate the calls and swap between them.

==== Call hold / transfer to another extension ====
- R – places call on hold. Hang up and telephone will ring until call on hold is picked up again.

==== Call forwarding (unconditional) ====
- *21*(phone number)# – forward all calls to (phone number)
- *#21# – check status
- #21# – deactivate

When this service is active, the dial tone changes to a two–frequency 'siren' tone.

==== Alarm / reminder call ====
- *55*[time in 4–digit 24h format]# e.g. for 8:30 am dial *55*0830#
- *#55# – check status
- #55# – cancel

Most exchanges confirm setup with a verbal announcement; however, some exchanges may use a ringing tone to indicate successful service setup and a busy tone to indicate an error/invalid code.

=== Services on Virgin Media Ireland cable network ===
(Codes are unique to Virgin Media Ireland and do not follow ETSI guidelines)

==== Caller ID services ====
- 141 – caller ID default override – withhold caller ID on this call
- 142 – caller ID default override – present caller ID on this call

==== Call forwarding ====
===== Call forwarding (unconditional) =====
- *70 – immediately followed by (phone number)
- #70 – deactivate

===== Forwarding to voicemail =====
- *75 – activate when busy
- #75 – deactivate when busy
- *77 – forward if unanswered
- #77 – deactivate if unanswered

==== Call waiting ====
- *72 – activate
- #72 – deactivate

===== Answering call waiting =====
- R1 – answer waiting call and disconnect current call.
- R2 – answer waiting call and place current call on hold or swap between calls.

==== Anonymous call rejection ====
- *90 – activate
- #90 – deactivate

==== Redial last number called ====
- ##

The subscriber will either hear a tone or a voice message to confirm services have been set up or deactivated.

=== Mobiles ===
- GSM supplementary service codes – All of Ireland's mobile providers use the standard GSM codes to control special services such as call forwarding, barring, call waiting etc.

== Number changes ==
Several major number changes have occurred since 1990. The telephone number changes in Dublin and Cork took several years to complete, as they were busier area codes with few available lead digits. Other number changes took place in just one step, with all numbers being changed simultaneously.

To minimise disruption simultaneous working was enabled, allowing old numbers to remain mapped and active for a run-in period of one year. Caller ID only displayed the new numbers. This was followed by recorded announcements which remained active for at least a year, advising callers of the number change. Eventually this would be replaced by a dialling error message.

=== 1990–1994 ===
Dublin (01) changes to 7-digits.

- All local numbers with the area code 01 changed from 6–digits to 7–digits in five stages between 1990 and 1994:
  - On 2 April 1990, numbers beginning with 23, 24, 26, 27, 28, 70 and 79 were prefixed with 6.
  - On 8 April 1991, numbers beginning with 8 and 69 were prefixed with 2.
  - On 4 April 1992, numbers beginning with 4 and the remaining 6–digit numbers beginning with 2 were prefixed with 8. Numbers beginning with 95 and 98 were prefixed with 2.
  - On 24 April 1993, numbers beginning with 75, 780, 781, 782, 783 and 784 were prefixed with 4, while numbers beginning with 60, 61, 68, 71, 76, 77, 785and 789 were prefixed with 6, and numbers beginning with 72, 73, 74, 786, 787 and 788 were prefixed with 8.
  - On 16 April 1994, numbers beginning with 3 were prefixed with 8, while numbers beginning with 5 and 9 were prefixed with 4.

=== 1998–2000 ===
- All local numbers with the area code 041 changed from 5–digit to 7–digit. Numbers in the Drogheda minimum numbering area (MNA) were prefixed by 98 and in the Ardee MNA by 68.
- All local numbers with the area code 042 changed from 5–digit to 7–digit. Numbers in the Dundalk MNA were prefixed by 93, in the Carrickmacross MNA by 96 and the Castleblayney MNA by 97.
- All local numbers with the area code 049 changed from 5–digit to 7–digit. Numbers in the Cavan MNA were prefixed by 43, in the Cootehill MNA by 55, in the Oldcastle MNA by 85 and the Belturbet MNA by 95.
- All local numbers with the area code 065 changed from 5–digit to 7–digit. Numbers in the Ennis MNA were prefixed by 68, in the Ennistymon MNA by 70 and the Kilrush MNA by 90.
- All local numbers with the area code 066 changed from 5–digit to 7–digit. Numbers in the Tralee MNA were prefixed by 71, in the Dingle MNA by 91, in the Cahirciveen MNA by 94 and the Killorglin MNA by 97.

Cork (021) changes to 7 digits.

- All local numbers with the area code 021 changed from 6–digits to 7–digits in two stages.
  - From September 1998, numbers beginning with 40 were prefixed with 2, while numbers beginning with 43 and 33 were prefixed by 7.
  - From February 2000, numbers beginning with 2, 3, 5, 6, 7, 8 or 9 were prefixed with 4.
- The prefix 080 was previously used for calls to Northern Ireland, but this changed to 048 following the Big Number Change.

=== 2002–2003 ===
- Area codes in parts of counties Meath and Offaly were merged into the single area code 046, including Navan, Nobber, Kells, Trim, Enfield and Edenderry. The 0405 area code was abolished. All local numbers became 7–digit.
- All local numbers with the area code 056 changed from 5–digit to 7–digit. Numbers in the Kilkenny MNA were prefixed by 77, in the Castlecomer MNA by 44 and the Freshford MNA by 88.
- Area codes in County Carlow and parts of counties Kildare, Kilkenny, Laois and Wicklow were merged into a new area code 059, including Carlow, Bagenalstown, Athy and Baltinglass. The area codes abolished were 0503, 0507 and 0508. All local numbers became 7–digit.
- Area codes in County Sligo and County Leitrim and parts of counties Cavan, Donegal and Roscommon were merged into the single area code 071, including Sligo, Boyle, Carrick-on-Shannon, Drumshanbo, Manorhamilton. The area codes abolished were 072, 078 and 079. All local numbers became 7–digit.
- The majority of area codes in County Donegal were merged into the single area code 074, including Letterkenny, Lifford, Ramelton, Buncrana, Dungloe and Donegal. The area codes abolished were 073, 075 and 077. All local numbers became 7–digit.
- Area codes in parts of counties Galway, Offaly, Roscommon, Westmeath and Longford were merged into a new area code 090, including Athlone, Banagher (North), Ballinasloe, Roscommon, Portumna. (Note: In 2002 the Portumna MNA split from the area code 0509 and merged into the new area code 090.) The area codes abolished were 0902, 0903 and 0905. All local numbers became 7–digit.
- Area codes in parts of counties Galway, Mayo, Roscommon and Sligo were merged into the single area code 094, including Castlebar, Swinford, Claremorris, Ballinrobe, Castlerea and Ballaghaderreen. The area codes abolished were 0907 and 092. All local numbers became 7–digit.

=== 2005–2006 ===
- All local numbers with the area code 044 changed from 5–digit to 7–digit. Numbers in the Tyrrellspass MNA were prefixed by 92, in the Mullingar MNA by 93 and the Castlepollard MNA by 96.
- Area codes in County Wexford and parts of counties Carlow and Wicklow were merged into the single area code 053, including Wexford, Enniscorthy, Ferns and Gorey. The area codes abolished were 054and 055. All local numbers became 7–digit.
- Area codes in counties Laois and Offaly and parts of counties Galway and Westmeath were merged into the single area code 057, including Portlaoise, Abbeyleix, Tullamore and Birr. The area codes abolished were 0502, 0506 and 0509. All local numbers became 7–digit.

=== 2008–2009 ===
- All local numbers with the area code 023 changed from 5–digit to 7–digit. Numbers in the Bandon MNA were prefixed by 88.
- All local numbers with the area code 043 changed from 5–digit to 7–digit. Numbers in the Longford MNA were prefixed by 33 and in the Granard MNA by 66.
- All local numbers with the area code 052 changed from 5–digit to 7–digit. Numbers in the Clonmel MNA were prefixed by 61, in the Cahir MNA by 74 and the Killenaule MNA by 91.
- All local numbers with the area code 064 changed from 5–digit to 7–digit. Numbers in the Killarney MNA were prefixed by 66 and in the Rathmore MNA by 77.

=== Mobile numbering ===
- Mobile numbering became 7–digit in the mid–1990s

=== Possible future changes ===
All local numbers with the area code 01 (Dublin and surrounds) are currently 7–digits, but may change to 8–digits in the future, although breaking the city into separate area codes would match the rest of the national system.

A review and public consultation on the future of Ireland's numbering plan was published in 2013.

== Historical numbering ==
=== Defunct non-geographic codes ===
- 1850 – Local rate, shared cost, untimed
- 1890 – Local rate, shared cost, timed
- 076 or +353 76 – VoIP services

All of the above were withdrawn on 1 January 2022.

=== Defunct access codes ===
- 16 – former international access code
- 03 – formerly used for calls to Great Britain. The format was 03 + NDC code + local number.
- 08 – formerly used for Northern Ireland landlines
- 084 – formerly used for Belfast landlines

=== Defunct operator services ===
- 10 – national operator assistance (withdrawn in 2007)
- 114 – international operator assistance (withdrawn in 2007)
- 910 – operator-assisted calls to some areas without direct dialling (withdrawn in the early 1980s)
- 1190 – Telecom Éireann national directory assistance (withdrawn in the early 2000s and replaced with 11811, originally 190)
- 1197 – Telecom Éireann UK directory assistance (withdrawn in the early 2000s and replaced with 11818, originally 197)
- 1198 – Telecom Éireann international directory assistance (withdrawn in the early 2000s and replaced with 11818, originally 198)
- 191 – Telecom Éireann repair services (withdrawn in the late 1990s)
- 196 – telemessaging services, whereby callers could ask an operator to send a postcard with a printed message (withdrawn in the late 1990s)

A range of numbers from 192, 193 and 194 were once used for various Telecom Éireann customer service and account service lines.

=== Defunct information services ===
- 1191 – speaking clock (withdrawn on 27 August 2018)

=== Historical Northern Ireland access codes ===
- before 2000: 08 followed by Northern Irish area code and phone number e.g. Belfast 01232 xxx xxx was reached by dialling 08 01232 xxx xxx.

Belfast could previously be reached by dialling 084 in place of the UK area code 0232.

=== Historical Great Britain access codes ===
Until the early 1990s, the 03 numbering range was originally used for calls to Great Britain, including the Channel Islands and the Isle of Man, with the Irish prefix 030 replacing the UK trunk code 0.

Calls to British cities using the director telephone system were also possible using shorter codes:

- 031 – London (01)
- 032 – Birmingham (021)
- 033 – Edinburgh (031)
- 034 – Glasgow (041)
- 035 – Liverpool (051)
- 036 – Manchester (061)

031 was replaced with 03071 and 03081 when 01 was split into the area codes 071 and 081 in 1990.

Use of 03 for this purpose was discontinued in 1993, when the international access code changed from 16 to 00, with calls to Great Britain (but not Northern Ireland) requiring the country code +44 and the area code in full.

== See also ==
- List of dialling codes in the Republic of Ireland
