= List of dialling codes in the Republic of Ireland =

Telephone dialling codes in Ireland

Country code: +353
International call prefix: 00
Trunk prefix: 0

This is a list of telephone dialling codes for the Republic of Ireland. Fixed-line telephone users do not need to dial the dialling code when they are contacting someone else within their own area.

== Geographic codes ==
Irish geographic codes generally correspond to the areas in the list below. Some exceptions and overlap may apply, as the codes reflect the evolution & technical history of the telephone network, rather than exact geographical county & town boundaries.

=== Dublin area (01) ===
Code	Numbering area
01	Dublin (including parts of county Wicklow, county Kildare and county Meath)

=== Cork area (02) ===
Code	Numbering area
021	Metropolitan Cork, Kinsale
022	Mallow
023	Bandon
024	Youghal
025	Fermoy
026	Macroom
027	Bantry
028	Skibbereen
029	Kanturk

=== East, Midlands and Northern area (04) ===
Code	Numbering area
0402	Arklow
0404	Wicklow
041	Drogheda, Ardee, Duleek
042	Dundalk, Carrickmacross, Castleblayney
043	Longford, Granard
044	Mullingar, Kinnegad, Castlepollard, Tyrrellspass
045	Naas, Newbridge, Kildare, The Curragh
046	Navan, Kells, Trim, Edenderry, Enfield
047	Monaghan, Clones
048	Northern Ireland
049	Cavan, Cootehill, Oldcastle, Belturbet

=== Midlands and Southeast area (05) ===
Code	Numbering area
0504	Thurles, Templemore
0505	Roscrea
051	Waterford, Carrick-on-Suir, New Ross, Kilmacthomas
052	Clonmel, Cahir, Killenaule, Fethard
053	Wexford, Enniscorthy, Ferns, Gorey
056	Kilkenny, Castlecomer, Freshford, Urlingford, Gortnahoe
057	Portlaoise, Abbeyleix, Tullamore, Birr
058	Dungarvan
059	Carlow, Bagenalstown, Athy, Baltinglass

=== Southwest area (06) ===
Code	Numbering area
061	Limerick, Shannon, Scariff
062	Tipperary, Cashel
063	Rathluirc (Charleville)
064	Killarney, Rathmore
065	Ennis, Ennistymon, Kilrush
066	Tralee, Dingle, Castleisland, Killorglin, Cahersiveen
067	Nenagh
068	Listowel
069	Newcastlewest

=== Northwest area (07) ===
Code	Numbering area
071	Sligo, Manorhamilton, Carrick-on-Shannon
074	Letterkenny, Donegal, Dungloe, Buncrana

=== Western area (09) ===
Code	Numbering area
090	Athlone, Ballinasloe, Portumna, Roscommon
091	Galway, Gort, Loughrea
093	Tuam
094	Castlebar, Claremorris, Castlerea, Ballinrobe
095	Clifden
096	Ballina
097	Belmullet
098	Westport
099	Cill Rónáin

== Mobile codes ==
=== Mobile network operators (MNOs) ===
NDC	Network	Notes
083 and 086	Three Ireland	086 previously belonged to O_{2}.
085	eir mobile	previously known as Meteor and eMobile
087	Vodafone Ireland	formerly Eircell

=== Mobile virtual network operators (MVNOs) ===
NDC	Network	Notes
083	BlueFace (defunct)	Hosted on Three
085	GoMo	Hosted on eir
085	Lidl Connect	Hosted on eir. Voicemail number is 089 909 9505
087	An Post Mobile	Hosted on Vodafone
087	Clear Mobile	Hosted on Vodafone
087	Just Mobile (defunct)	Hosted on Vodafone
089	48	Hosted on Three. Numbers begin with 2 and 4
089	Tesco Mobile	Hosted on Three. Numbers begin with 2 and 4
089	iD Mobile (defunct)	Hosted on Three. Numbers begin with 70 and 71
089	Lycamobile	Hosted on eir. Numbers begin with 94 through 98
089	Sky Mobile	Hosted on Vodafone. Numbers begin with 65 through 67
089	Virgin Mobile	Hosted on Three. Numbers begin with 60 through 62

=== M2M (Machine to Machine) Communication ===
NDC	Network	Notes
088	All networks	Reserved for machine-to-machine (M2M) communications, using the format 088 xxxxx xxxxx. This prefix was originally used for the Eircell TACS network active from 1985 to 2001.

== Reserved Numbers ==
Code	Allocation
03	Reserved for future changes in the numbering plan
07	All except 0707, 0700, 071, 074 and 076 are reserved without assigned purpose
0700	Reserved for personal numbering
0800	Reserved

== Special numbers ==
Code	Allocation
00	International access
048	Northern Ireland access
020 91	Dummy numbers reserved for drama, film and television use to avoid accidental clashes with real telephone numbers
076	VoIP services - phased out 1 January 2022
080	Mailbox for landline users (formerly access code for Northern Ireland)
0818	Non-geographic numbers (inclusive/charged as per geographic numbers)

These codes, unlike most of the above, cannot be dialled from abroad. The following are special numbers dialled by themselves:

Number	Purpose
999 or 112	Emergency services
13xxx	Carrier preselect codes
1471	Last-call return
171	Mobile and fixed line voicemail
172, 173, 174X and 179	Reserved for network use
1901 to 1999	Helpline / customer service numbers for telecommunications companies. All are free of charge.
199000	Identifies current number on OpenEir PSTN & ISDN lines.

The following codes begin special phone numbers:

Code	Purpose
116xxx	Harmonised service of social value
118xx	Directory enquiries (multiple commercial providers offer a variety of services in this number range)
151X	Premium-rate numbers (per-call cost)
15X0 (X between 2 and 9 inclusive)	Premium rate numbers (per-minute cost)
1598 and 1599	Premium rate adult services
1800	National freephone / toll free
00800	International freephone / toll free
1850	Non-geographic - phased out 1 January 2022
1890	Non-geographic - phased out 1 January 2022
1891	Reduced cost internet access (possibly timed)
1892	Local rate internet access (timed)
1893	Variable cost internet access (timed)
199	Network engineering tests

The following prefix regular phone numbers in order to affect how they are handled:

Code	Purpose
13	Carrier Selection (Third party long distance, international and internet services). These codes override the default carrier.
141	Withhold Caller ID (CLIR) - (overrides preset for this call only)
142	Present Caller ID (CLIP) - (overrides preset for this call only)

Legacy, historic and obsolete codes

Code	Purpose
16	Former International Access Code (replaced by EU standard 00)
03	Formerly used for calls to Great Britain. The format was 03 + STD code + local number
08	Formerly used for Northern Ireland landlines (Now 048). e.g. Belfast 01232 xxx xxx was reached by dialling 08 01232 xxx xxx
084	Formerly used for Belfast landlines
10	National operator assistance (withdrawn in 2007)
114	International operator assistance (withdrawn in 2007)
910	Operator-assisted calls to some areas without direct dialling (withdrawn in the early 1980s)
1190	Telecom Éireann national directory assistance (withdrawn in the early 2000s and replaced with 11811, originally 190)
1197	Telecom Éireann UK directory assistance (withdrawn in the early 2000s and replaced with 11818, originally 197)
1198	Telecom Éireann international directory assistance (withdrawn in the early 2000s and replaced with 11818, originally 198)
191	Telecom Éireann repair services (withdrawn in the late 1990s)
196	Telemessaging services, whereby callers could ask an operator to send a postcard with a printed message (withdrawn in the late 1990s)
1191	Speaking clock (withdrawn on 27 August 2018)
0300	Premium Rate (Now 15XX)
17	Callback tests (Service codes may be contained in 19 range, but are not published)

Historical Great Britain access codes (Discontinued in 1993)

Code	Purpose
031	London (01), was replaced with 03071 and 03081 when 01 was split into the area codes 071 and 081 in 1990.
032	Birmingham (021)
033	Edinburgh (031)
034	Glasgow (041)
035	Liverpool (051)
036	Manchester (061)

== See also ==
- Telephone numbers in the Republic of Ireland
