= Telephone numbers in Ireland =

The island of Ireland is divided in two jurisdictions: the Republic of Ireland and Northern Ireland.

- For the Republic of Ireland, see Telephone numbers in the Republic of Ireland and List of dialling codes in the Republic of Ireland
- For Northern Ireland, see Telephone numbers in the United Kingdom and List of dialling codes in the United Kingdom
