= Smart Telecom =

Irish telecom operator

- Company type: Private
- Industry: Telecom
- Founded: 5 January 1989
- Defunct: 10 March 2011
- Headquarters: Dublin, Ireland
- Area served: Ireland
- Key people: Brendan Murtagh, John Riordan
- Products: broadband, landline
- Revenue: ▲€45.6 million (2005)
- Operating income: ▼ -€19.436 million (2005)
- Website: smarttelecom.ie

Smart Telecom (AIM:SMR) was an Irish telecom operator that started as a phone card seller. It was also the third largest provider of cost-sensitive telecom services sector in Ireland, behind the incumbent operators eircom and BT Ireland. It had an estimated 50,000 land-line customers and 18,000 broadband subscribers.

Smart operated several services:

- Point-to-Point, Transparent LAN Services and Telephony services across a Resilient Packet Ring backbone
- Payphones (to 2006)
- Broadband Internet Access
- FTTH/IPTV services
- Point-to-point licensed microwave radio links

Backbone services were available to users in parts of Dublin, Cork, Dundalk, Limerick, Letterkenny, Galway, Sligo, Waterford, Wexford, Portlaoise, Mullingar, Carlow, Cavan, Drogheda, Killarney, Tralee and Clonmel.

== Broadband service ==
At the end of March 2006 there were 322,000 broadband subscribers in Ireland, 35% of internet subscription. Broadband accounted for 19% of all internet subscriptions.

== History ==
Smart was also a bidder for the Irish mobile operator Meteor following the decision of its parent company to sell all international mobile operators; however on 21 July 2005 it was announced Smart Telecom had withdrawn, leaving the company to be bought by eir, the largest telecoms operator in Ireland, and owner of the local loop throughout the entire country.

On 16 November 2005 Smart Mobile was offered the country's fourth 3G mobile phone network licence. Vodafone Ireland, O2 Ireland and 3 Ireland already had secured a 3G mobile phone network licence. Acceptance of the licence would have required Smart Mobile to launch its services by 30 April 2007, with 33 percent demographic coverage by 31 October 2009 and 53 percent coverage by 2011.

The 3G spectrum access fee was set at €114.3 million, with an annual spectrum fee of €2.2 million and an administrative fee of up to €300,000 a year. Taking on a 3G licence would have required substantial capital investment by Smart.

On 9 November 2005 Smart Telecom announced that it had raised €55.2 million in new funding. This involved a placing of new ordinary shares at a price of €0.20 per share and a debt equity conversion of €10.8 million.

But this licence was withdrawn in February 2006 by Comreg due to a failure by Smart to provide a €100 million performance guarantee bond in a form acceptable to it within the specified deadline. There was a significant drop in the companies share price subsequently. Smart appealed the decision.

Smart Holdings Ltd lost a bid to sponsor the weather forecast on RTÉ to Glanbia on 7 April 2006. The High Court ruled that its referential bid – based on a formula equivalent to the highest bid received +5% was not valid, because RTÉ terms of offer did not permit this.

=== e-Nvi takeover and MPEG-4 headend ===
In September 2007, Smart announced their takeover of e-Nvi, a Dublin-based Triple play provider. It also announced that it was investing in an MPEG-4 head end for its own Triple play service; the vendor was confirmed as Thomson.net in October 2007.

== Problems in 2006 ==
Having head-hunted 49 managers from eir to promote and market broadband door-to-door, some up to five months earlier, the Chief executive of Smart Telecom, Oisin Fanning fired 26 of them abruptly on 31 August 2006. This took place in the context of unmet sales targets of 64,000 sign-ups, aggravated by Smart being unable to get its equipment into many Eir exchanges which meant that Smart had no product to sell in many parts of Ireland.

Smart Telecom (SMR.L) shares traded at 9c in early September 2006, less than two-thirds of their flotation price. Sales for 2006 reached €60 million – up from €45 million in 2005. However losses of €23 million in 2005 were eclipsed by losses of €35 million in 2006.

Later prospects were defined by the achievement of substantial growth in broadband sales volume and eliminating losses, heralded promises which stakeholders, including Seán Quinn, were waiting patiently to emerge.

=== Chief executive resigns ===
Oisin Fanning, chief executive resigned from this position on 9 September 2006 on health grounds. Further senior resignations also took place. The acting chief executive, Ciaran Casey, then carried out an in-depth financial review of the company as a further investment of €30 million was sought.

The chairman of the company, Raymond Kings, stated that Brendan Murtagh, the largest shareholder in the company would continue to provide short-term working capital while longer term funding options were being investigated.

=== Divesting non-core businesses ===
Details of a strategic review, published on 22 September 2006 meant that the employee cohort would be cut from 348 to c100, additional loan funding was to be provided by major shareholders and the company would divest its payphone and pre-paid call card businesses so as to focus on its corporate and residential broadband businesses.

Revenue in the six months to the end of 30 June 2006 dropped 15% to €20.3 million. There was a 61% increase in administrative costs leading to a loss, before exceptional items, of €17.9 million and an operating loss up to €31 million.

=== Eir's termination of service ===
On 2 October 2006 Eir, owed €4m by Smart, including arrears of €1.7m, ceased providing wholesale services to Smart Telecom. The result was that the majority of Smart Telecom's customers could not make outgoing calls (except for emergency numbers). According to RTÉ news at the time almost 45,000 customer voice lines were cut off, and Eir was in the process of disconnecting approximately 17,000 broadband customers. Smart issued a notice on their website stating that full service would be restored as soon as possible but declined to give any date for such a restoration.

Shortly afterwards, then-Communications Minister Noel Dempsey called on Eir to reconnect a full telephone service to Smart customers.

Comreg then announced an interim measure where phone lines to Smart customers were reconnected and they were given the option to join other providers.

=== Resolution ===
It was revealed on Friday, 6 October 2006 that BidCo, a company controlled by Brendan Murtagh, its largest shareholder, would purchase all of the company's assets, and would also take on its estimate €40m debt. This would also reportedly allow broadband service to be restored immediately. It was confirmed Smart would dispose of the "calls only" packages, but would continue to provide call services to broadband customers.

In an email to customers on the same day, restoration of telephone and broadband services was announced along with a free upgrade of 3 Mbit/s to all broadband customers for the remainder of 2006 as a token of their appreciation.

== Problems in 2009 ==
=== Smart Telecom Examinership August 2009 ===
Smart Telecom entered examinership in August 2009 with an internal examiner reviewing their debts revenue and business structure. Smart Telecom were in debts of up to €70 million to creditors and in loans.

It was said that Smart had a fair chance of coming out of examinership but also had 2 new investors that would be willing to invest in the company.

Smart Telecom continued operations as normal with no effects to any of its customers during this period.

=== Digiweb Purchase ===
In November 2009, the Irish broadband supplier Digiweb announced their intention to purchase Smart. The full takeover took place in early 2010 and the company was officially dissolved in March 2011.
