= WLR =

WLR may refer to:

- Wisconsin Law Review, a student-edited legal journal at the University of Wisconsin Law School
- Willandra Lakes Region, a World Heritage Site in New South Wales, Australia
- West Lancashire Railway, a disused railway in Lancashire, England
- WLR FM, a local radio station covering Waterford City and County in Ireland
- Washington Law Review, a student-edited legal journal at the University of Washington School of Law, USA
- Weekly Law Reports, an official periodical of United Kingdom case law published by the Incorporated Council of Law Reporting
- Weapon Locating Radar, an Indian Artillery detecting radar being developed by DRDO
- West Lincoln Road, a road in Miami Beach, Florida, USA
- Wholesale line rental, a type of telecommunications service
- WLR, the hull classification symbol of a river buoy tender used by the US Coast Guard
- Whole Lotta Red, the second studio album by American rapper Playboi Carti
- WLR Store, a book distributor that exports Brazilian books to Portugal, Spain, and the United States
