= Examinership =

Process in Irish law

Examinership is a process in Irish law whereby the protection of the Court is obtained to assist the survival of a company. It allows a company to restructure with the approval of the High Court.

To obtain the appointment of an examiner it is necessary to petition the High Court and persuade the court that there is a reasonable prospect of survival of the company and the whole or part of its undertaking if an examiner is appointed.

The examiner has a fixed period of 70 days (extensible to 100 days) in which to prepare a scheme of arrangement, which must be approved by at least one class of creditors of the company. If it can be shown that the scheme provides for the survival of the company and the whole or part of its undertaking and that it is not unfairly prejudicial to any creditor(s) of the company the court has discretion to approve the scheme.

In most schemes of arrangement an investor will invest in the company and part of the money invested will be used to pay a dividend to each class of creditors.

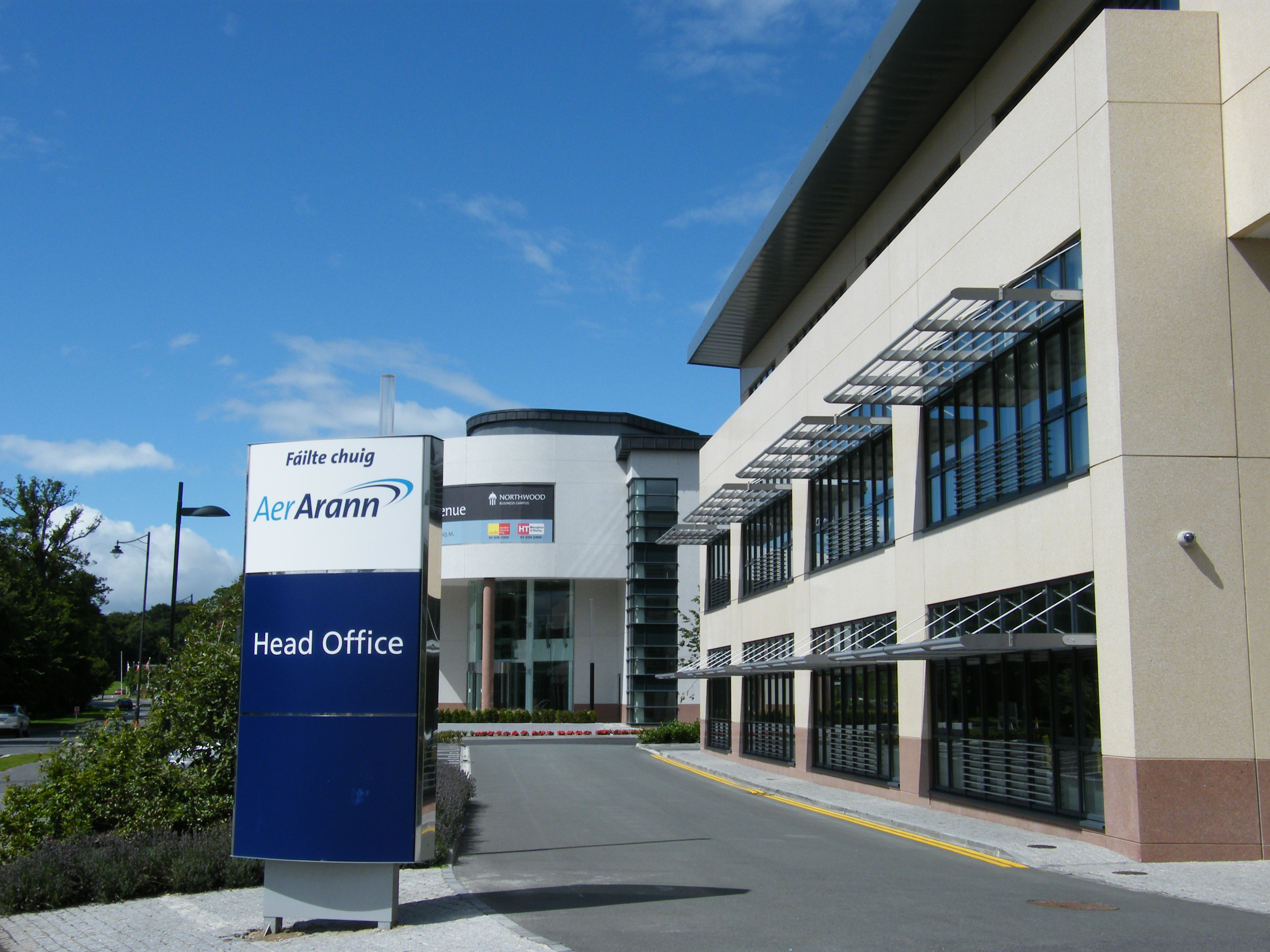
Aer Arann – in examinership 2010

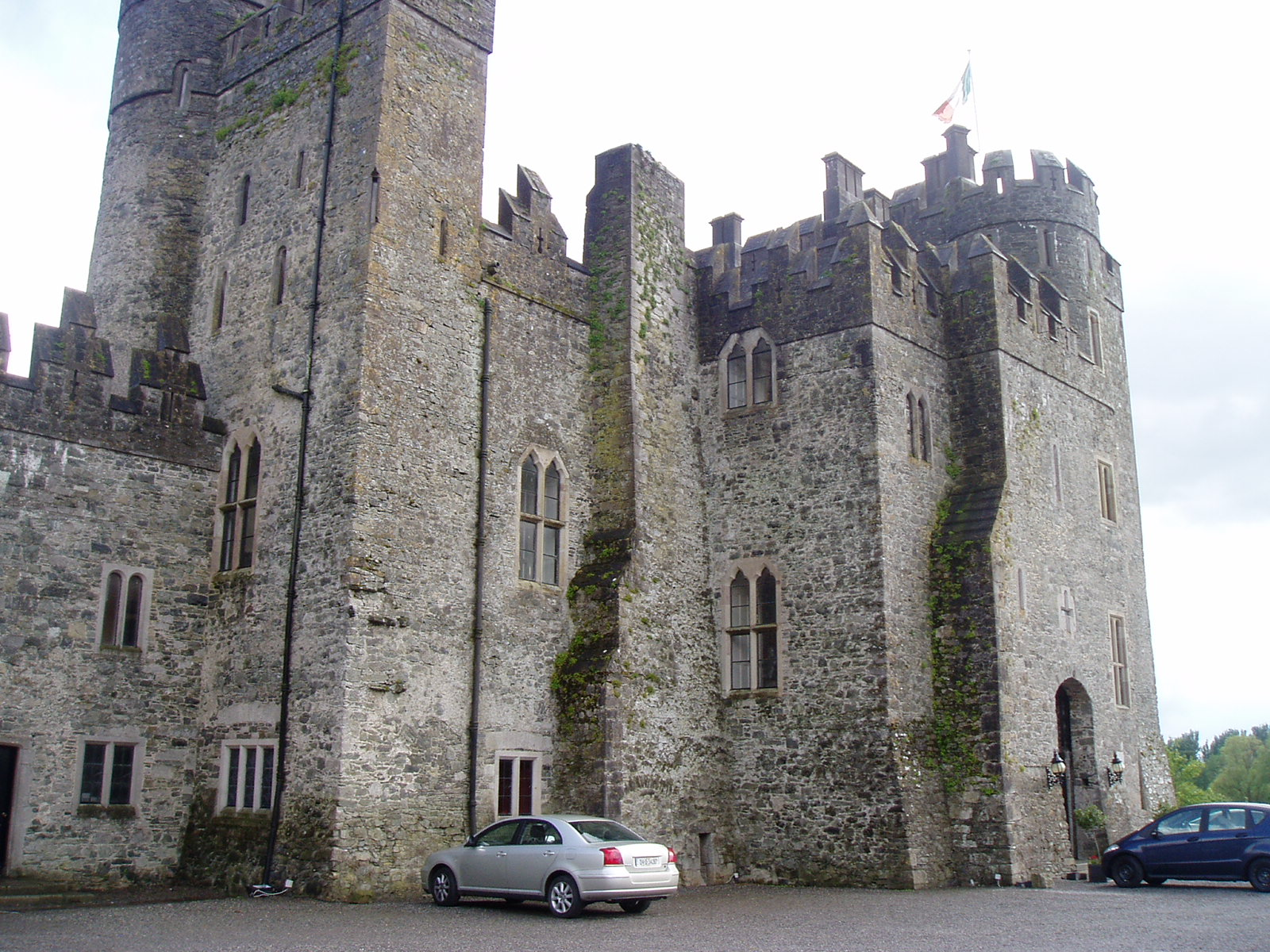
Kilkea Castle – in examinership 2009

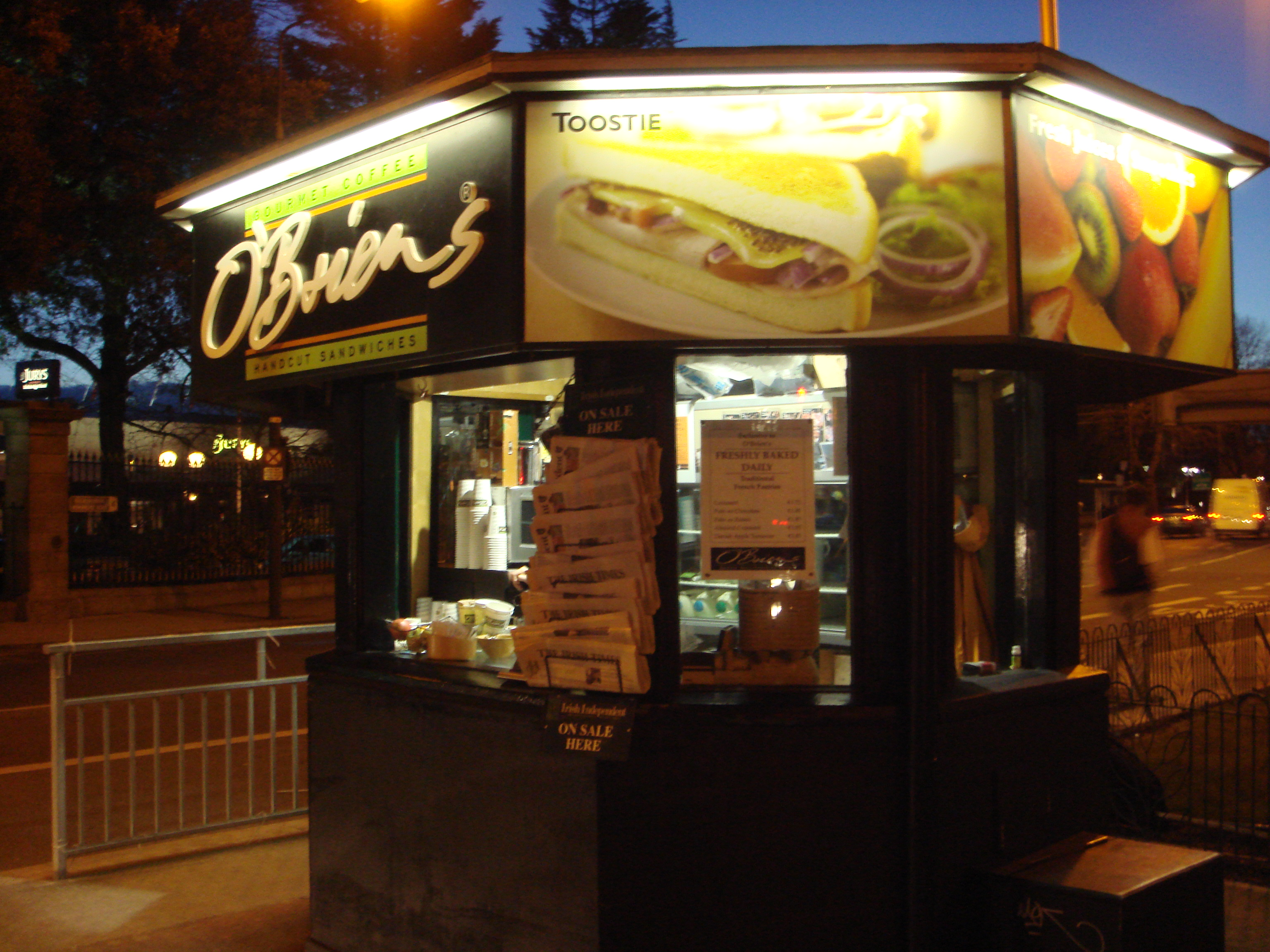
O'Briens Irish Sandwich Bars – in examinership 2009

== Overview ==
The principal rationale underlying the concept of examinership is to allow a company that is experiencing financial difficulties a period of protection from creditor action during which a third party (the examiner) has an opportunity to examine the affairs of the company and, if there is a reasonable prospect of the survival of the company and all or part of its undertaking as a going concern, to formulate proposals for a scheme of arrangement to facilitate such a survival.

The law relating to examinerships has its origins in the Companies (Amendment) Act 1990 which was passed by the Oireachtas at a time when the Goodman Group of companies appeared to be in danger of going out of business . Subsequently, the Companies (Amendment) (No. 2) Act 1999 was passed to give legislative effect to the recommendations of the Company Law Review Group which had been set up in 1994 by the minister for enterprise and employment to review the law relating to examinerships. The 1999 Act became effective on 1 February 2000 and made very substantial and significant changes to the examinership regime .

Court procedures in relation to examinerships are set out in Order 75A of the Rules of the Superior Courts.

== Appointment of an examiner ==
An examiner is appointed to a company on foot of a petition brought before the High Court. The petition must be supported by an affidavit sworn by or on behalf of the petitioner. It must also be accompanied by a report prepared by an independent accountant.

=== Who can petition the court ===
The petition can be brought by the company, its directors, its creditors, its shareholders or any combination of these.

Petitions for the appointment of an examiner are usually brought by the company itself, its directors or its shareholders.

Where the petition is presented by the company itself, it would appear that an ordinary resolution of the members is sufficient. A copy of the resolution (if written) or an extract of the minutes of the meeting at which the decision to petition for the appointment of an examiner is made should be exhibited to the verifying affidavit.

Where the petition is presented by the directors, it is necessary to exhibit to the verifying affidavit evidence of a properly passed board resolution.

The petition must nominate an examiner and must be supported by evidence which is sufficient to demonstrate to the court that an examiner should be appointed.

=== Grounds for the appointment of an examiner ===
The principal legal test for the appointment of an examiner is whether or not there is a reasonable prospect of the survival of the company and the whole or any part of its undertaking as a going concern.

Accordingly, not only must there be a reasonable prospect of the survival of the company, there must also be a reasonable prospect of the survival of the whole or any part of its undertaking as a going concern.

It is also necessary to demonstrate that the company is or is likely to be unable to pay its debts. A company is deemed to be unable to pay its debts if: it is unable to pay its debts as they fall due; the value of its assets is less than the amount of its liabilities taking into account both contingent and prospective liabilities; or where section 214(a) or (b) of the Companies Act 1963 applies to the company.

A company does not have to be insolvent at the time of the presentation of the petition; the court can take account of a future event which is likely to have an adverse effect on the company's ability to discharge its debts. However, an examiner cannot be appointed to a company which is already in liquidation. The existence of a winding up petition does not, in itself, prevent the appointment of an examiner. Where a receiver stands appointed for a continuous period of three days or more, an examiner cannot be appointed. The period of three days runs from the appointment of the receiver and it is not open to a petitioner to argue that the period has not started to run based on an alleged infirmity in the appointment.

Where an examiner is appointed to a company, the court may also appoint him as examiner of related companies and in a group situation this often arises though each group company should meet the test of having a reasonable prospect of survival of all or part of its enterprise.

=== The petition ===
The petitioner has a duty of utmost good faith, so all relevant information should be made available to the court. Failure to disclose any material issue relevant to the application may, depending on the circumstances, result in the application being dismissed.

The petition should contain a full history and background to the company, together with an overview of its initial trading history.

It should contain a comprehensive explanation of the reasons for the company's current financial difficulties and, where applicable, the measures the directors have taken to remedy the situation. The petition should conclude with an analysis of the reasons the petitioner believes the company and the whole or any part of its undertaking has a reasonable prospect of survival as a going concern and of the changes in conditions necessary to ensure its survival. These will also be reflected in the independent accountant's report.

Lastly, the petition must nominate an individual (who has given his prior consent to act) to be appointed as examiner and interim examiner, if appropriate. An affidavit of that individual's fitness to act as examiner must also be filed in court. Neither the petitioner's solicitor nor the solicitor who will act for the examiner should swear that affidavit.

=== The supporting affidavit ===
The petition must be supported by an affidavit sworn by or on behalf of the petitioner. Practice varies and occasionally the affidavit will duplicate all of the information contained in the petition. Usually, this is unnecessary and the supporting affidavit can simply contain an averment that all information in the petition is correct and all relevant documentation in support of the information provided in the petition can be exhibited.

=== The independent accountant's report ===
A petition seeking court protection must be accompanied by the report of an independent accountant. The independent accountant can be the company's auditor or a person qualified to be appointed as an examiner of the company. However, in practice, the person nominated as examiner tends to be someone other than the independent accountant.

The report must deal with a wide range of issues as mandated by the Companies (Amendment) Act 1990 (as amended). Essentially, it must put basic information before the court and give a view regarding whether or not proposals for a compromise or scheme of arrangement would offer a reasonable prospect of the survival of the company and all or part of its undertaking as a going concern.

The report should indicate the changes or conditions necessary for the survival of the company. While these conditions are not binding on the examiner, it is important that they are carefully considered before being included in the report. The reason for this is that if one or more of the conditions are solely dependent on a creditor's agreement, absent such agreement, the court may take the view that the company's prospects of survival are diminished or even eliminated.

The independent accountant should say whether, in his or her view, an attempt to continue the whole or any part of the undertaking would be more advantageous to the members and the creditors as whole than a winding up of the company would be.

The report should also contain cash-flow projections to demonstrate the company's ability to trade during the protection period. If the company's cash-flow is dependent on the support of one or more financial institutions (for example, by way of an invoice discounting agreement), it may be advisable to reach a preliminary agreement in advance of the presentation of the petition with the relevant institution that such funding will not be withdrawn. If the company has insufficient funds to continue trading during the protection period, an examiner will not be appointed.

With the increase in the number of unsuccessful examinerships, the court has, in certain cases, scrutinised the independent report in more detail. This is particularly so where there is an objection to the appointment of an examiner by one or more of the company's creditors.

Therefore, it is essential that all information in the report and, in particular, the conditions for survival and any projected cash-flows, are carefully considered and supported by accurate information and analysis.

The requirement for the independent report to accompany the petition can be dispensed with for a ten-day period where there are exceptional circumstances outside the control of the petitioner and which could not have been reasonably anticipated by the petitioner. The appointment of a receiver will not of itself be an exceptional circumstance.

As with the petitioner, where the independent accountant has failed to exercise utmost good faith, the court may decline to hear the petition.

Moreover, where it is apparent from the report of the independent accountant or otherwise that there is evidence of a substantial disappearance of property of the company or other serious irregularities in relation to the company's affairs the court is required to hold a hearing to consider the evidence. There are various procedural guidelines concerning this hearing. The court is empowered to make such orders as it sees fit after the hearing including, if appropriate, an order for the trial of any issue.

In practice the courts appear to be of the view that there is insufficient time in the course of an examinership to conduct a detailed investigation in relation to potential breaches of company law and where the possibility of such breaches arise in the confirmation hearing the court may simply decline to grant the petition.

== Court protection ==
A company obtains the protection of the court from its creditors from the moment the petition is presented in the court offices.

=== The presentation of the petition ===
An ex parte application is made to court on the day of presentation of the petition for directions in relation to the hearing of the petition and frequently, the appointment of an interim examiner is sought.

As an interim examiner has the same powers of certification of expenses as a full examiner, the court will be equally cautious in acceding to the appointment of an interim examiner.

Although each situation will vary, one of the primary reasons for seeking the appointment of an interim examiner is to facilitate him commencing his work immediately rather than waiting until after the full hearing. In addition, it is often felt that the appointment of an interim examiner offers a certain level of reassurance to creditors and suppliers and to the company's employees who are frequently unaware of the intended application until after it has been made.

While the Rules of the Superior Courts provide that the court may treat the hearing for directions as the full hearing (and therefore, in theory, dismiss the application at that stage) this would appear to be inconsistent with section 3B of the Companies (Amendment) Act 1990 which provides that the court shall not dismiss any petition until such time as all creditors have had an opportunity to be heard.

The petition is directed to be heard on a day usually seven to ten days after the date of presentation of the petition. Directions are given for its advertisement and the court will generally direct that the company's largest creditors are served with a copy of the petition papers.

Section 12 of the Companies (Amendment) Act, 1990 sets out a number of formalities that must be adhered to in relation to the appointment of an examiner. In this regard, notice of the petition must be delivered to the Registrar of Companies within 3 days from the presentation of a petition. Moreover, the appointment of the examiner, together with the date, if any, set for the hearing of his first report must be advertised. The advertisements must be placed in two daily newspapers circulating in the district where the company has its registered office within three days of the appointment and in Iris Oifigiúil within 21 days of the appointment.

=== The hearing of the petition ===
At the full hearing of the petition, parties whose interests can be affected by the making of an order on the petition are entitled to be heard and to support or oppose the granting of court protection on foot of the petition and the appointment of an examiner. Where an interim examiner has been appointed, he will file a short report outlining the work carried out by him during the period of interim protection and highlighting any relevant issues that may have arisen during that period.

The court has a wide discretion in terms of the order or orders that can be made on the hearing of the petition. However, if, for whatever reason the court forms the view that the company does not have a reasonable prospect of survival, it must refuse to grant the petition and it must withdraw the court's protection. The court may order the immediate appointment of a liquidator in such circumstances.

If the court is satisfied that there us a reasonable prospect of survival of the company and all or part of its undertaking it may exercise its discretion to appoint an examiner. The court will consider issues such as whether there has been full disclosure by the applicant, the conduct of the directors and, the impact on employees in exercising its discretion in this regard.

=== Effect of court protection ===
From the time of presentation of the petition in the court office, the company is under the protection of the court.

From the commencement of the protection period, the company is effectively immune from creditor action. This prohibition is subject only to a party's (usually a bank's) entitlement to exercise a right of set-off and therefore, absent agreement from the bank not to exercise that right, it is advisable that the company opens a separate trading account for the protection period.

Unless recommended by the independent report or otherwise approved by the court on application by the examiner, the company cannot discharge any liabilities incurred prior to the presentation of the petition. Typically, the independent accountant's report will recommend payment of any arrears of wages to employees together with any suppliers or trade creditors that are essential for the survival of the company during the protection period.

=== Period of court protection ===
The period of court protection is 70 days plus a discretionary 30 days) which may be granted on application to the High Court.

Meetings of creditors and shareholders to consider any scheme of arrangement must be held within 35 days (or within a longer period on application to the High Court) from the date of appointment of an examiner.

In practice, the meetings of creditors and shareholders rarely take place within the first 35 days of the protection period and the examiner usually applies to the High Court for an extension of time in which to file his report. That period can be extended beyond the initial 70-day period (to a maximum of 100 days from the date of presentation of the petition) if the examiner demonstrates to the court that, although he cannot do so within the 70 days, he will be able to report to the court if additional time is afforded to him. Typically, the affidavit grounding the application for an extension will indicate that the examiner is in negotiations with one or more proposed investors and, on that basis, he believes that he will be able to formulate proposals for a scheme of arrangement.

Importantly, if, at any stage, the examiner forms the view that the company no longer has a reasonable prospect of survival, he should make an application to the High Court pursuant to section 18(9) of the Companies (Amendment) Act 1990 for directions and the court may, on such application, give such directions or make whatever order it thinks fit, including an order discharging the examiner, lifting the protection of the court and directing that the company be wound up. Any delay in making any such application may adversely impact on the examiner's subsequent application for payment of his remuneration.

== The examiner ==
=== The examiner's duties ===
The examiner's duties are to conduct an examination of the company's affairs, formulate proposals for a scheme of arrangement, convene meetings of the members and creditors for the purpose of voting on any proposals and report his findings to the court.

The examiner must act honestly, reasonably and with the utmost candour. Any failure to do so may result in the court disallowing some or all of the examiner's remuneration, costs and expenses.

An examiner is not immune from suit and may not exclude personal liability in the scheme of arrangement.

=== Proposals for a scheme of arrangement ===
The examiner's most important function is to attempt to formulate proposals for a scheme of arrangement which will facilitate the survival of the company and the whole or part of its undertaking as a going concern.

A scheme of arrangement frequently involves a new investor acquiring all or substantially all of the shareholding in the company together with a write down of the company's debt across a range of classes of creditors. In certain circumstances, third party investment is not required.

The examiner divides creditors into various classes (e.g. unsecured creditors, leasing creditors, retention of title creditors, floating chargeholders, fixed chargeholders, Revenue Commissioners, contingent creditors, etc.) and once proposals for a scheme of arrangement are formulated, they are circulated to each creditor and member and the examiner then convenes meetings of the various classes of creditors together with meetings of appropriate classes of shareholders.

Provided that at least one class of creditor votes in favour of accepting the examiner's proposals, the examiner may proceed to seek court approval sanctioning his scheme of arrangement thereby making it binding on dissenting parties. The voting by creditors at their meetings is by a majority in number representing a majority in value of the claims represented at that meeting.

=== The examiner's powers ===
An examiner has wide-ranging statutory powers, some of which can be exercised unilaterally and some of which are exercisable only with the sanction of the court.

The following are some of the powers an examiner may have:

1. To seek to have the directors' powers transferred to him
2. To obtain information
3. To seek directions from the court
4. To discharge pre-petition debts
5. To borrow
6. To deal with charged property (see Fixed Charge Holders)
7. To certify expenses
8. To regularise improper transactions

The nature and scope of the powers conferred on an examiner was recently considered by the court in the case of Missford Limited trading as Residence Members Club One of the most frequently utilised powers is the ability to certify certain liabilities incurred during the period of protection. Commonly such certificates are referred to as 'section 10 certificates'.

The effect of a section 10 certificate is that all certified liabilities have priority over all other claims against the company (excluding secured creditors' claims) and the examiner's remuneration, costs and expenses.

An examiner can only certify expenses where he forms the opinion that the survival of the company as a going concern would otherwise be seriously prejudiced. Importantly, only liabilities incurred during the protection period can be certified. It should also be noted that the court has the discretion to review any amounts certified by the examiner.

== Effect on creditors ==
=== Fixed charge holders ===
The debts due to fixed chargeholders may be written down in a scheme of arrangement, subject to the proposal not being unfairly prejudicial to the fixed chargeholder. In broad terms proposals which write down a fixed chargeholder's debt to below the inherent value of the charge will likely be considered unfairly prejudicial. This important principle can lead to evidential conflict over what in fact is the inherent value of a chargeholder's security.

In certain circumstances, the examiner may dispose of assets which are subject to fixed or floating charges. A disposal will only be permitted where it is likely to facilitate the survival of the whole or any part of the company as a going concern. Absent consent from the affected creditor, the examiner will be required to make an application to the High Court before any such disposal occurs.

If the assets are subject to a charge 'which, as created, was a floating charge' the secured creditor will be deemed to have a corresponding security over the proceeds of the disposal.

However, if the assets disposed of are subject to a fixed charge, any disposal will be conditional on the net proceeds or the net amount which would be achieved on an open market sale by a willing vendor (whichever is the greater) being applied towards discharging the sum secured by the charge. In the case of a fixed charge, the amount payable will include not only all principal and interest, but also any costs to which the chargeholder is entitled by law or under the terms of the security.

An examiner's remuneration and costs take precedence over the rights of a fixed chargeholder in the event of a subsequent liquidation of the company. However, the examiner's certified liabilities do not have priority over fixed chargeholders, but do have priority over floating chargeholders' interests.

This allows an examiner certain flexibility to prejudice floating chargeholders by borrowing during the examinership period.

=== Landlords ===
Arrears of rent accrued under a lease may be reduced in any scheme of arrangement. However, absent agreement, it is not possible to reduce the rental payment going forward or to change the rights of the lessor in relation to non-payment of rent or breach of other covenant in the future.

However the court may allow an examiner to disclaim a lease in its totality, in which case the capitalised value of the lease will be recognised as an unsecured liability in the examinership.

=== Guarantees ===
While there is a prohibition on enforcing guarantees given by third parties during the protection period, the guarantors' liability remains notwithstanding that the principal debt may be varied pursuant to a scheme of arrangement.

However, to pursue its rights under the guarantee, the creditor has to go through a notice procedure with the guarantor prior to the meeting of creditors to consider the scheme of arrangement. Failure to adhere correctly to the notice procedure can result in a creditor losing its rights pursuant to the guarantee.

== The confirmation hearing ==
At the hearing where the scheme of arrangement is considered by the court, any creditor or member whose claim or interest would be impaired if the proposals were implemented, has a right of audience.

The court has discretion to confirm proposals, modify or reject them. The court may not confirm the proposals if they are not "fair and equitable" or if they are "unfairly prejudicial" to the interests of any interested party.

In practice, the court will be slow to find that proposals are unfair or inequitable or unfairly prejudicial in circumstances where the affected class will receive a higher dividend than it would receive in a liquidation.

The court has recently clarified the grounds on which secured creditors may object to a scheme of arrangement.

The proposals must be finalised and complete before confirmation of the court is sought. In this regard, the court will refuse to confirm a scheme of arrangement which is to be funded by an investor unless the investor has been found and has entered into a legally binding commitment to provide the investment funds and demonstrated that the funds are available, usually by putting them on deposit with the examiner's solicitors If the court confirms the proposals they are binding on all the members and creditors affected by them from an effective date, usually nominated in the scheme and so ordered by the court.

The examiner's appointment usually terminates on this effective date and the administration of the scheme is a matter for the company.

== Examiner's remuneration, costs and expenses ==
The examiner must make an application to the High Court for payment of his remuneration, costs and the reasonable expenses incurred by him.

The application is made ex parte grounded on an affidavit sworn by the examiner providing details of all work carried out by him and his staff in the relevant period. He must vouch the costs and expenses and must also provide details of the basis on which his fees have been charged. In this regard, the High Court will expect an examiner to have agreed the basis on which his fees will be charged with the petitioner. In addition, the affidavit must specify what use, if any, the examiner has made of the services of the staff and/or the facilities of the company.

The High Court has recently asserted control over the remuneration afforded to an examiner both as regards the scope of the work undertaken and as regards the hourly rate of remuneration.

All remuneration, costs and expenses of the examiner sanctioned by the court (with the exception of liabilities certified under section 10) rank in priority to claims secured by floating charges and to claims secured by fixed charges.

In the event of the company going into liquidation following examinership, the examiner's sanctioned remuneration, costs and expenses (including certified expenses under section 10) will rank in priority to the remuneration, costs and expenses of the liquidator.

== Organisations who have sought/used the examinership process ==
Until 2006, an average of 10 companies per year sought examinership, with the onset of the Irish financial crisis the number exceeded 60 in 2008.

=== Pre 2009 ===
- Xtra-vision plc (1994)
- CityJet (1996)
- Tara Television (2002)
- Chorus Communications (2004)
- Shamrock Rovers F.C. (2005)
- Cork City F.C. (2008)
- Drogheda United F.C. (2008)

=== 2009 ===
- Zoe Developments
- Buy&Sell
- Capital Bars
- Smart Telecom
- Golden Discs
- O'Briens Irish Sandwich Bars
- Kilkea Castle
- Tivway

=== 2010 ===
- Aer Arann
- McInerney Homes
- Four Star Pizza

=== 2011 ===
- Xtra-vision
- Irish Medical Systems Holdings
- John Hinde Limited
- Mr Binman
- Fastnet Line
- Fallon & Byrne

=== 2012 ===
- BHT Group
- A number of companies within the eircom group, including:
  - eircom Ltd.
  - Meteor Mobile Communications Ltd.
- Neylon Maintenance Services Ltd
- Atlantic Homecare
- CarryLane Ltd – owner of the Ritz-Carlton hotel Powerscourt

=== 2013 ===
- B&Q Ireland Ltd

=== 2016 ===
- Ladbrokes Ireland
- Debenhams Ireland

=== 2020 ===
- CityJet

== See also ==
- Chapter 11 in the United States
- Administration (law) in the United Kingdom
- Receivership
