= Viatel =

Irish technology company

Viatel Inc.
- Industry: Technology, telecommunications
- Founder: Martin Varsavsky (original US company), Colm Piercy (divested Irish business)
- Successor: Viatel Technology Group
- Headquarters: United States

Viatel, founded in the United States in 1991, was a Nasdaq-quoted technology company which operated fiber optic networks in several countries, including in the United Kingdom during the mid-1990s. Viatel Technology Group, a Dublin-based technology company focused primarily on the Irish market, was founded from some of the elements of Viatel Inc. following acquisition by Digiweb in 2013.

== History ==
=== Early years ===
Viatel was founded in 1991, in Colorado, by Martin Varsavsky. In 1994, it went public on the Nasdaq stock exchange. Four years later, Varsavsky sold his stake in the company for US$200 million and left the company. In 1999, Viatel's market capitalization reached US$1.2 billion. At that time, Viatel's second-largest outside shareholder was George Soros, while the largest outside stake was held by the global telecommunications company COMSAT.

On 2 May 2001 Viatel Inc. and its all of its U.S. subsidies filed for relief under Chapter 11 of the U.S. Bankruptcy Code in the state of Delaware. In 2013 it was reported, in Süddeutsche Zeitung, that documents provided by Edward Snowden revealed that several telecom operators, including Viatel, had played a role in helping the British intelligence agency Government Communications Headquarters (GCHQ) to tap onto worldwide fiber-optic communications.

=== Sale to Digiweb and divestment of Viatel Technology Group ===
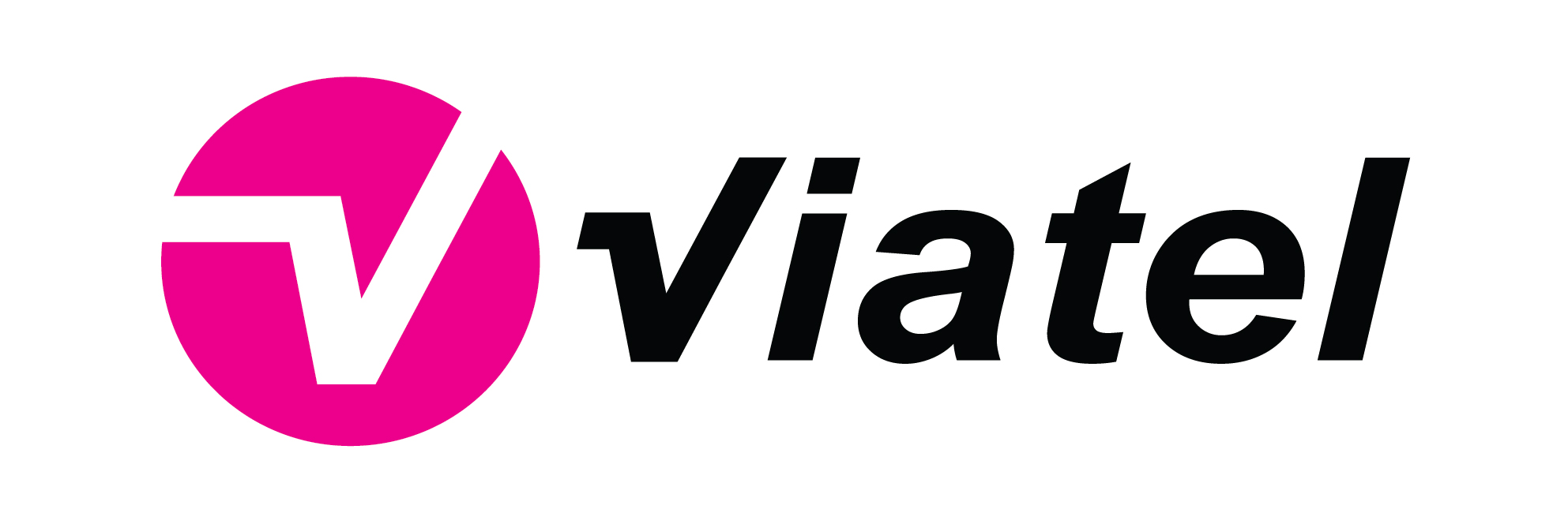
Viatel logo, as used in the United Kingdom, as of 2015

The European arm of Viatel was purchased, in May 2013, by the Irish telecoms operator Digiweb, with at least some Viatel investors retaining interests in the new setup. In November 2015, it was announced that Zayo was in the process of buying Viatel's UK and mainland Europe network, leaving the Irish network to continue under the name of Viatel; This €98.8m transaction was completed on 31 December 2015.

The remaining elements of Viatel, branded as the 'Viatel Technology Group', focused on the Irish and European markets, primarily providing business telecoms, cloud and cyber security services. In 2018, Paul Rellis, formerly of Microsoft, was appointed as CEO of the Digiweb Group, with Digiweb and Viatel as the main operating branches.

In 2020, Viatel Technology Group acquired Ripplecom and Irish Telecom Service. During 2021, the company acquired Skytel Networks and Nova Telecom. This was followed, in 2022, by the acquisition of ActionPoint, Wifibre, and supportIT. Sungard AS Ireland was acquired in May 2023. By 2023, Viatel Technology Group had over 310 employees with offices in Dublin, Dundalk and Limerick.

Viatel Technology Group was included, by Deloitte Ireland, on its 2022 list of "Ireland's Best Managed Companies". In 2023, Viatel was named "Best Place to Work" at the Tech Excellence Awards, and Managed ICT Company of the Year by the Chambers Ireland InBUSINESS Recognition Awards.
