= United Kingdom PSTN migration =

Discontinuation of the public switch telephone network in the United Kingdom

As in many other countries, the United Kingdom is retiring its part of the global circuit-switched public switched telephone network (PSTN).

British Telecom, the country's dominant telco, had announced its intention to switch off its PSTN infrastructure by December 2025, including both copper baseband landline telephone connections and its ISDN network. In May 2024, this date was revised to 31 January 2027. Openreach, the major telecommunications infrastructure provider in the United Kingdom, is also due to retire its Wholesale Line Rental service.

This process has been planned since 2017, and will roll out in a series of phases. All providers are expected to implement Voice over IP and other IP-based network services to replace copper PSTN and ISDN connections.

== PSTN switch-off ==
All major British telecommunication companies, including other Broadband Stakeholder Group companies such as Virgin Media and Sky UK that have their own infrastructure, will cease to support both copper PSTN and fibre ISDN connections. Instead, analogue landline telephones will be expected to connect to adaptors on home routers, and businesses connecting to the PSTN via ISDN connections will be expected to move to SIP connections to the VoIP network, a transition that has already been performed by many companies.

Voice telephony will continue to follow the E.163 and E.164 standards, as with current mobile telephony, with the interface to end-users remaining the same. Analogue telephones and cordless phones will continue to operate via traditional analogue phone sockets, but with those sockets now connecting to the on-premises router or PBX. No changes will need to be made to the mobile phone networks, which already interconnect via data networking technologies.

== Retirement of the copper last-mile access network ==
Copper and aluminium landlines will continue to be used for ADSL and VDSL Internet access for the time being. Fibre to the premises Internet access is planned to be rolled out nationally, allowing the eventual retirement of the entire copper telephone network. Openreach's copper plant has been reported to have billions of pounds of scrap value, even after accounting for the cost of removal, with over a million tonnes of copper buried under the streets. Full retirement of the copper access network is expected to stretch into the 2030s.

One problem with the replacement of the copper last mile is the discontinuation of electrical power to devices via the phone network, including critical devices such as health monitors. Work is in progress to address these problems.

== Problems and opposition ==
In December 2025, industry regulator Ofcom fined Virgin Media £23.8 million for problems encountered while transitioning its vulnerable and elderly customers to an internet-based system in 2022/2023. There had been a number of incidents where customers were left without their emergency telecare systems.

In March 2026, according to a survey by phone service provider, Phonely, 58.7% of adults over the age of 50 were still unaware of the planned shutdown. 3.2 million households were still to be transitioned.

In May 2026, The Guardian reported concerns of residents in rural areas in Devon, Cornwall, Wales and Scotland, who did not have a strong enough mobile phone signal to provide an alternative to the copper wire landlines. The report included industry estimates that only 1% of customers had insufficient signal to make an emergency call. A campaign organisation for the over-60s, Silver Voices, collected 100,000 signatures to a petition to "save our landlines".

== See also ==
- Public switched telephone network § Technology retirement
