= Golden Discs =

Irish entertainment retail chain

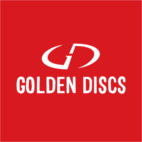
- Type: Private (company number: 26481)
- Industry: Media/Music retail
- Founded: 1 July 1962; 64 years ago in Dublin, Ireland
- Founders: Jack Fitzgerald and Tom Rogers
- Headquarters: Dublin, Ireland
- Number of locations: 21
- Area served: Ireland
- Key people: Stephen Fitzgerald (owner and managing director)
- Products: Records, CDs, blu-ray discs & DVDs, Accessories, Merchandise
- Revenue: €11.2 million (2023)
- Website: goldendiscs.ie

Golden Discs, officially Golden Disc Group Ltd., is Ireland's largest and oldest home-entertainment specialist retail chain.

== History ==
=== Origins and early history ===
Golden Discs was established in 1962 on Dublin's Tara Street by Jack Fitzgerald and Tom Rogers as Trans-Atlantic Record Agency (TARA), in the location of the former Tara Records founded by George O'Reilly. The name Golden Discs was first used in 1966.

The chain experienced rapid growth in the 1970s and 1980s, opening 30 outlets including five in Northern Ireland. However, in 1986, the 'megastores' of British music retailers Virgin and HMV "invaded" Dublin, according to The Irish Press, and by October 1987 had already taken 19.7% of Ireland's retail music market:

When the so called megastores opened in Dublin 12 months ago - Virgin in the former McBirney's building and HMV stores in Grafton Street - Armageddon was predicted. Independent retailers were going to the wall, those chains such as Golden Discs and Dolphin Records were also bound to fail, the pundits said... For many years Golden Discs ruled the roost as THE major record retailer in the country, with 16 stores at the beginning of 1987, nine of those in Dublin... The company employs over 200 people and has just opened a new shop in Nutgrove Shopping Centre. Another is planned for Liffey Street in the near future.

In the same article, a spokesman for the company said that although Golden Discs was opening new stores, they had put a "rationalisation programme" in place for the countrywide operations, and that so far there had been no redundancies. By October 1987, in response to the changing market, the company had closed down its central purchasing operation and moved to a system whereby every manager of each store was responsible for the individual stock orders in his or her shop:

"The megastores have not had the impact everyone thought they would have", the spokesman says, but agrees their presence promoted Golden Discs' rationalisation. It also encouraged the group to look at their strengths - stores throughout the country, specialists in Irish artists through their link with Tara Records and their presence in the market for 25 years. One store specialises in compact disc and classical music sales.

=== Decline ===
In the year ended March 2001, Golden discs opened two new shops, in the Pavillion Centre in Swords, Co. Dublin and in the Crescent Centre in Limerick. Its turnover rose by 14% that year, to €29.7 million, and its after-tax profit rose by 31%, to €833,000.

Co-founder Jack Fitzgerald transferred his shares in the business to his sons in 2006. He remained on the board until 2010.

The chain's presence around the country had diminished in the early part of the 2000s, making a significant loss by 2008 and entering examinership in 2009, with multiple shop closures during this period, in line with similar trends with other physical music and movie retailers in other markets.

=== Revival ===
In 2013, Golden Discs reported its first profit since 2008 and opened six new shops. In 2017, the company set about its first attempts at expansion since the national economic recession with the opening of three new branches in November of that year located in The Square Town Centre, Tallaght, Main Street, Wexford and a pop up shop at 52 Henry Street, Dublin 1. The company also overhauled its website in the same year and made its full product offering available for purchase online. As of September 2014, the company reportedly employed "more than 100 people across 17 stores".

In November 2016, it was announced that Golden Discs concessions would move into more than half of Tesco Ireland's supermarkets as part of a three-year commercial agreement. "Golden Discs at Tesco" concessions operated as standalone units within Tesco supermarkets, offering CDs, DVDs and Games. The agreement made Golden Discs Ireland’s largest home-entertainment retailer with 96 locations nationwide. This agreement came to an end in 2019.

In 2018, shops opened in Navan Town Centre Shopping Centre, County Meath, Market Cross Shopping Centre, Kilkenny and Liffey Valley Shopping Centre, Dublin.

In 2019, an increase in turnover to €13.2m and profits to €192,000 was cited as being down to an increase in sales of vinyl. The company opened new stores in Sligo, Tralee, Drogheda and Jervis Shopping Centre that year.

Like all other Irish retailers, the chain shut its doors in March 2020 due to the restrictions implemented in response to the COVID-19 pandemic in Ireland. The company offered click-and-collect services from various shops during lockdown periods. Golden Discs shops re-opened in May 2021.

The company celebrated its 60th anniversary in 2022.

In 2022, the company closed its branch in Tralee, and subsequently closed two of its Cork City shops in 2023, diminishing its presence in Munster. In 2023, the company also closed its Dún Laoghaire shop after over 20 years of business.

The business is currently owned and operated by Stephen Fitzgerald, the son of the founder, Jack Fitzgerald. It has 20 shops throughout Ireland.

== Operations ==
=== Products ===
Golden Discs stocks most formats of physical music and movies, including LP records, CDs, DVDs, Blu-ray discs, and 4K Ultra-HD discs.

Golden Discs also focuses on hardware, stocking various turntables, speakers and headphones and merchandise.

=== Locations ===
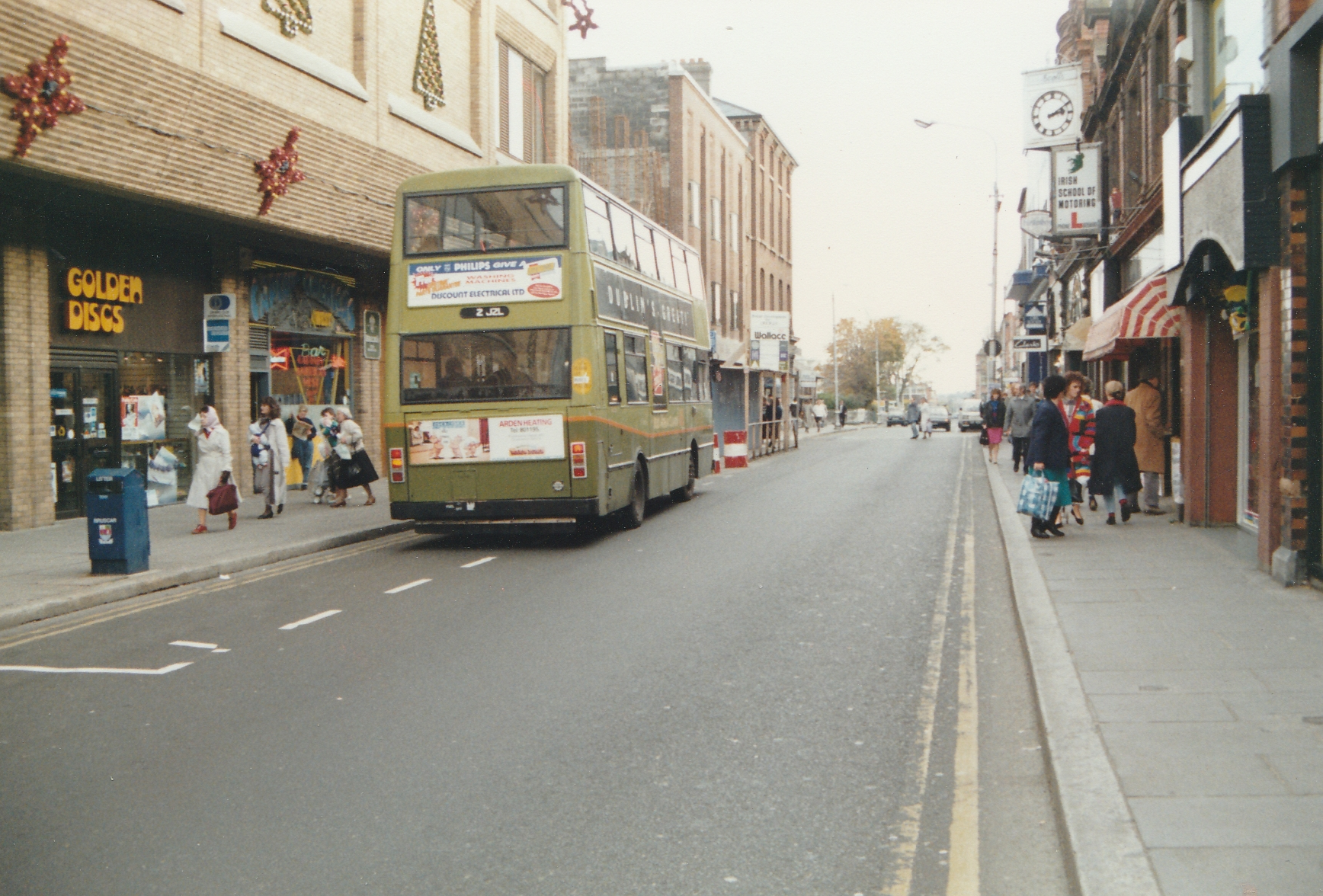
The Dún Laoghaire branch, at left of picture, in the 1980s

As of 2014, the company had 17 shops. The number increased to 23 by November 2021,, and dropped to 21 by late 2023 and to 20 by 2025.

=== Pop Merchandise ===
In 2022, Golden Discs launched a concept shop, Pop Merchandise (styled as 'POP!'), across most of its outlets. This an in-store division specialised in music and movie-related merchandise. The company cited an increase in interest around pop culture products as the driving force for the new concept shop.

=== Vinyl8 ===
The Golden Disc Group also owns and operates 'Vinyl8', an online-only shop launched specifically targeted at "the dedicated vinyl enthusiast".
