= Digiweb =

Irish telecommunications company and technology group

Digiweb Group
- Type: Private Limited Company
- Industry: Telecommunications
- Founded: 21 March 1997; 29 years ago
- Headquarters: Dundalk, Ireland
- Key people: Colm Piercy, Chairman; Paul Rellis, Group CEO
- Products: Fixed wireless and mobile broadband, web hosting and data centre services, business solutions, DSL, satellite
- Number of employees: >140 (Digiweb), >300 (group)
- Website: www.digiweb.ie

Digiweb is a telecommunications company in Ireland, supplying business and consumer broadband and web hosting, and a group of companies in the telecoms and technology sectors.

The company is 100% Irish-owned and run, and is headquartered in Dundalk, County Louth, with its technical, installation and sales offices in Dublin.

== History ==
Digiweb was founded on 21 March 1997. In May 2013, it acquired the UK-based telecommunications company Viatel, a part of a larger group.

== Broadband services ==
=== Home broadband ===
Digiweb offer a variety of broadband services in Ireland: Metro Wireless Broadband (broadband and phone since 2005), mobile broadband (during 2007), DSL, VDSL (over standard phone lines), Fibre broadband, and satellite broadband.

The main wireless broadband service offers various broadband packages from 5 Mbit/s down/1 Mb up (economy service) to 30 Mb down/1 Mb up (premium service). Transceiver locations are available in all major cities – Dublin, Cork, Limerick, Galway, Waterford, Kilkenny – as well as a dozen or so towns around Ireland including Drogheda, Dundalk and Letterkenny. The service requires line-of-sight to the transceiver location and is offered up to 10 km from the point-of-service; this limit was set under the original Comreg licence conditions, but is also a limitation of the system for adequate performance in heavy rain. Metro uses DOCSIS 2.0 over microwave frequencies. Digiweb are also testing a DOCSIS 3.0 platform supporting speeds in excess of 100 Mbit/s.

A smaller-scale wireless broadband service (using Airspan) is offered in smaller towns around the country.

As Digiweb offer a phone service without the Eircom copper pair, they are one of the few competitors along to Eircom's fixed line voice service.

=== Mobile broadband and phone ===
In April 2007, Digiweb announced that they are set to become Ireland's fifth mobile phone provider. ComReg, the telecoms regulator, allocated the 088 prefix to the new network – the same prefix used by Eircell's old analogue TACS system. The service would have been Ireland's first 4G network and should have taken 18 months to be rolled out, however the rollout was cancelled by early 2008.

=== Business broadband ===
In 2007, they launched a revised business broadband portfolio with speeds of 100 Mbit/s as well as higher-end solutions with extra capacity and symmetrical speeds. In mid-2008, they announced the launch of a 1 Gb business package.

== Web hosting services ==
Digiweb also provide web hosting and domain services in their purpose-built data centre based in Blanchardstown, Dublin. Services include shared, virtual, cloud, CoLo and dedicated hosting options.

== Other countries ==
Satellite broadband and ISP services such as hosting and domain registration are offered by Digiweb in Ireland, France, Italy and the United Kingdom.

== Awards ==
Digiweb were the 2007 Irish Telecommunications and ICT Company of the Year and were the second-fastest-growing technology sector business in Ireland in 2006.
