= Just Mobile =

JUST Mobile
- Company type: Private
- Industry: Mobile telecommunications
- Founded: 2010
- Founder: Stuart Kelly, Donal Lawless
- Defunct: 2011
- Headquarters: Dublin, Ireland
- Key people: Stuart Kelly, Donal Lawless, Seán Melly (former chairman)
- Products: Prepaid mobile phone network
- Number of employees: 5
- Website: www.justmobile.ie

Just Mobile (stylised as JUST Mobile) was a prepay mobile virtual network operator in Ireland which operated on the Vodafone Ireland network. It was founded in October 2010 and ceased operating 10 months later, in August 2011.

== History ==
Founded by Donal Lawless and Stuart Kelly, the company was funded by the founders and a BES fund managed by Powerscourt Capital Partners, an investment firm led by Irish entrepreneur Seán Melly. Melly was also chairman of Just Mobile. The company was incorporated in 2007, and launched to customers in October 2010. Upon launch, it created approximately 25 jobs, with plans to create up to 70 jobs in its first two years. Under its Just Cause scheme, the company made charitable donations of 5% of the value of every top-up.

== Closure ==
In August 2011, the company announced that it had failed to acquire the required funding to continue operating. On 2 August 2011, the Commission for Communications Regulation announced that Just Mobile would cease operations gradually, until final closure on 19 August 2011.

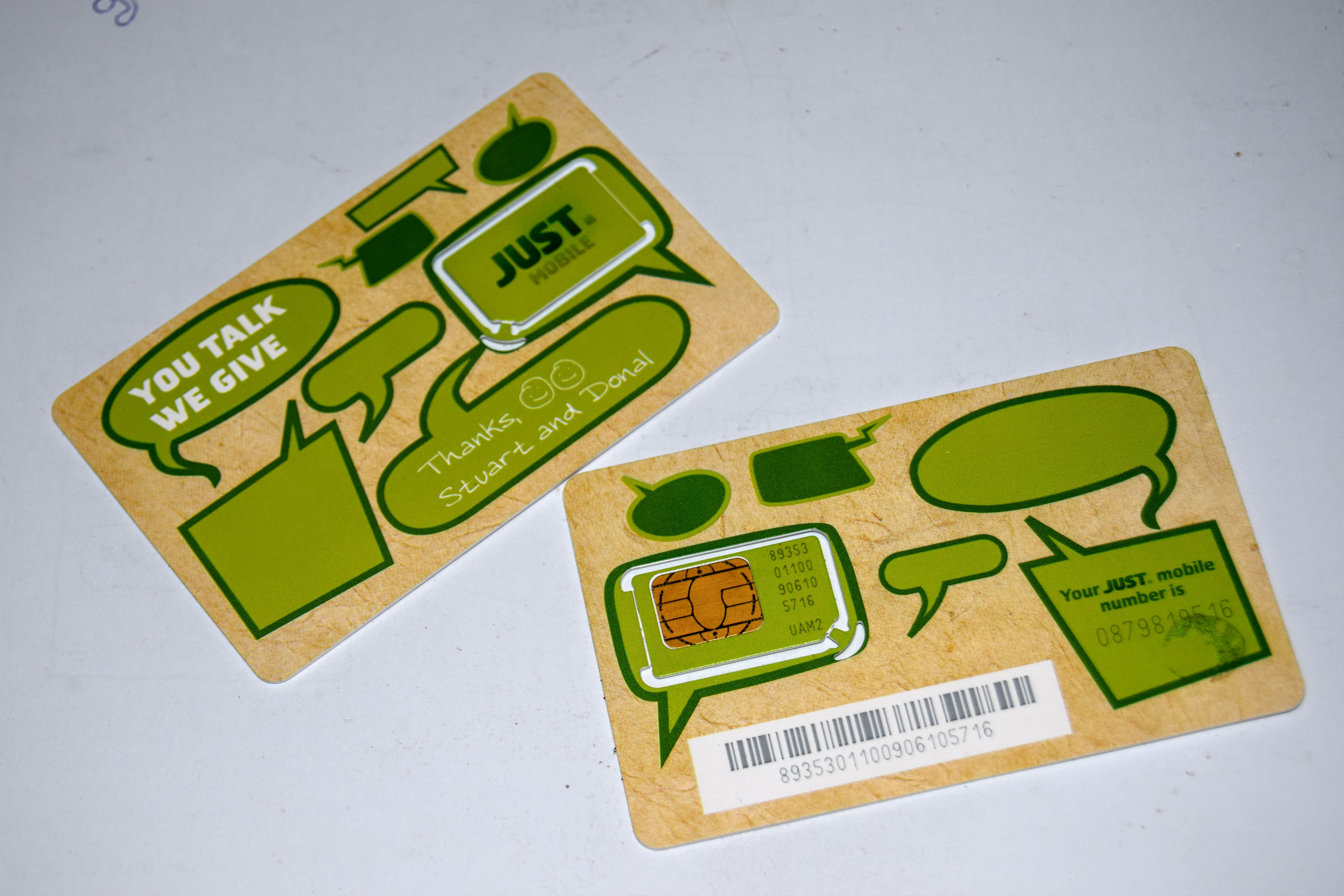
Just Mobile SIM cards issued through a free promotional pack

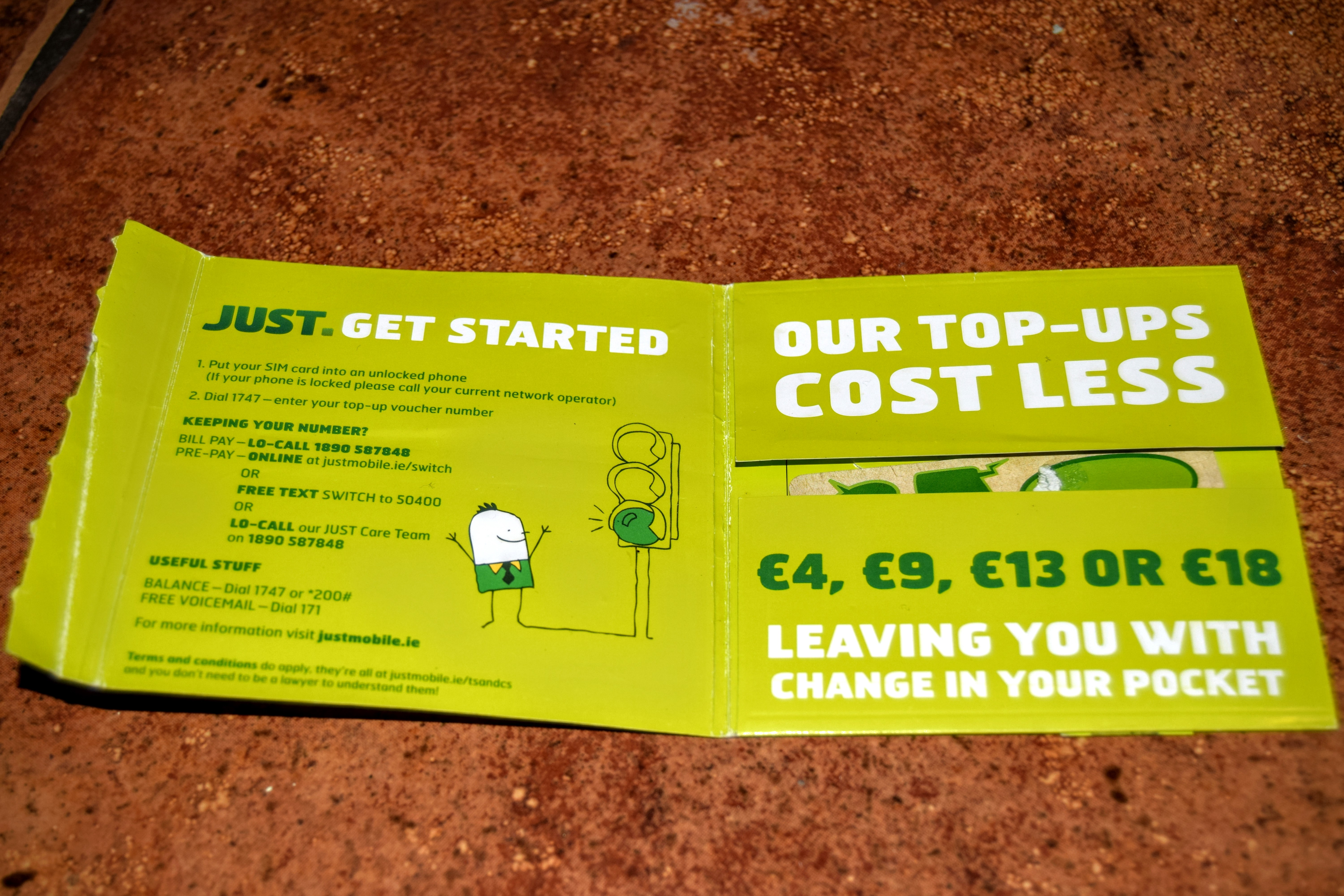
