= Wireless Telegraphy Act 1926 =

The Wireless Telegraphy Act 1926 is an act of the Oireachtas which regulates wireless telegraphy in the Republic of Ireland.

It is the legislation that requires operators of radio equipment in Ireland to hold the appropriate Wireless Telegraphy licence, unless exempted.

Exempt equipment may not cause interference and may not claim protection from received interference. Exempt equipment includes:

- CB radio
- Short range devices (including walkie talkies, radio LANs, RFID equipment and wireless microphones and audio systems)
- Certain satellite service terminals
- Mobile communications
- Cordless telephones
- Certain broadcast wireless stations
- Radio receivers in general (excluding televisions)
- Certain probing radar devices
- Personal locator beacons
- Certain mobile phone repeaters
