= Eir (telecommunications) =

French-owned telecommunication company incorporated in Jersey and operating in Ireland

Eircom Limited
- Logo used since 2015
- Type: Subsidiary
- Industry: Telecommunications
- Founded: 6 September 1999; 27 years ago in Dublin, Ireland
- Headquarters: 2 Heuston South Quarter, St John's Rd W, Kilmainham, Dublin 8, Ireland
- Area served: Ireland; United Kingdom
- Key people: Oliver Loomes (CEO); Miriam Hughes (non-executive chairman)
- Products: Fixed Telephony; Mobile telephony; Internet services; Digital TV
- Revenue: €1.265 billion (FY 14/15) €1.3 billion (FY 15/16E)
- Number of employees: 3,437
- Parent: NJJ Holding
- Subsidiaries: Eir Mobile; Open Eir; Eir Business NI; Eir UK; Eir Sport; GoMo
- Website: www.eir.ie

Eircom Limited, trading as Eir (/ɛər/ AIR; stylised eir), is a large fixed, mobile and broadband telecommunications company in Ireland. The company, which is currently incorporated in Jersey, traces its origins to Ireland's former state-owned monopoly telecommunication provider Telecom Éireann and its predecessors, P&T (the Dept. of Posts and Telegraphs) and before the foundation of the state, the telecommunications division of the GPO. It remains the largest telecommunications operator in Ireland and has overseas operations focused on the business and corporate telecom markets in the United Kingdom. The company was in majority state ownership until 1999, when it was privatised through a flotation on the Irish and New York Stock Exchanges.

Eir is currently majority owned by Xavier Niel's Iliad SA and his Paris-based NJJ Telecom Europe investment fund (64.5%). The group includes Monaco Telecom, Salt Mobile (Switzerland) Epic (Cyprus & Malta) and Lifecell (Ukraine). Other major investors include Anchorage Capital Group (26.6%), and Davidson Kempner (8.9%).

Eir operates a wholesale fixed-line network through its Open Eir unit, providing copper and fibre based access products to a wide range of Irish telecommunications companies. Its services include next generation access products, such as FTTH, FTTC (VDSL) and legacy copper based services, including ADSL and classic digital circuit switched products like PSTN and ISDN. It also offers a range of legacy leased line services.

The company's retail division markets these services directly to homes and businesses, and includes value added services like Eir TV and voice over broadband for home users and a wide range of digital services tailored to business customers.

Eir operates a national mobile network both under its own Eir brand and GoMo, a value-focused, online-only sub-brand. The network provides 2G, 3G, 4G and 5G services and ancillary services such as WiFi Calling and VoLTE.

== Market share ==
In the third quarter of 2019, Eir accounted for 39% of the Ireland's fixed voice market retail revenue and 45.3% market share by fixed-line retail and wholesale revenue and 19.1% of the mobile market (excluding mobile broadband and machine-to-machine subscriptions) or 15.6% of total subscriptions. Eir had 31.4% of fixed broadband subscriptions (comprising FTTH, FTTC/VDSL and ADSL) and 42.7% of FTTP subscriptions.

Its main fixed access infrastructure owning competitors are Virgin Media Ireland (which operates a cable TV and broadband network) and SIRO, a joint venture between publicly owned energy supplier, ESB and Vodafone. SIRO operates a FTTH network using ESB's physical infrastructure to carry fibres to individual homes and businesses. Imagine Communications, Digiweb and several other smaller ISPs also operate their own wireless networks using various technologies. Eir also faces retail competition from Vodafone, Sky, Digiweb and a large number of smaller ISPs using a mix wholesale access from Open Eir and SIRO to reach their customers.

Eir also faces competition from mobile operators and MVNOs both for its own mobile services and also as fixed line replacement products. Most of Eir’s competitors offer voice services and high speed 4G and increasingly 5G connectivity, which can often be faster than fixed services, particularly first-generation NGA products using VDSL and fibre to cabinet, which can only offer a maximum of 100 Mbit/s.

== Services ==
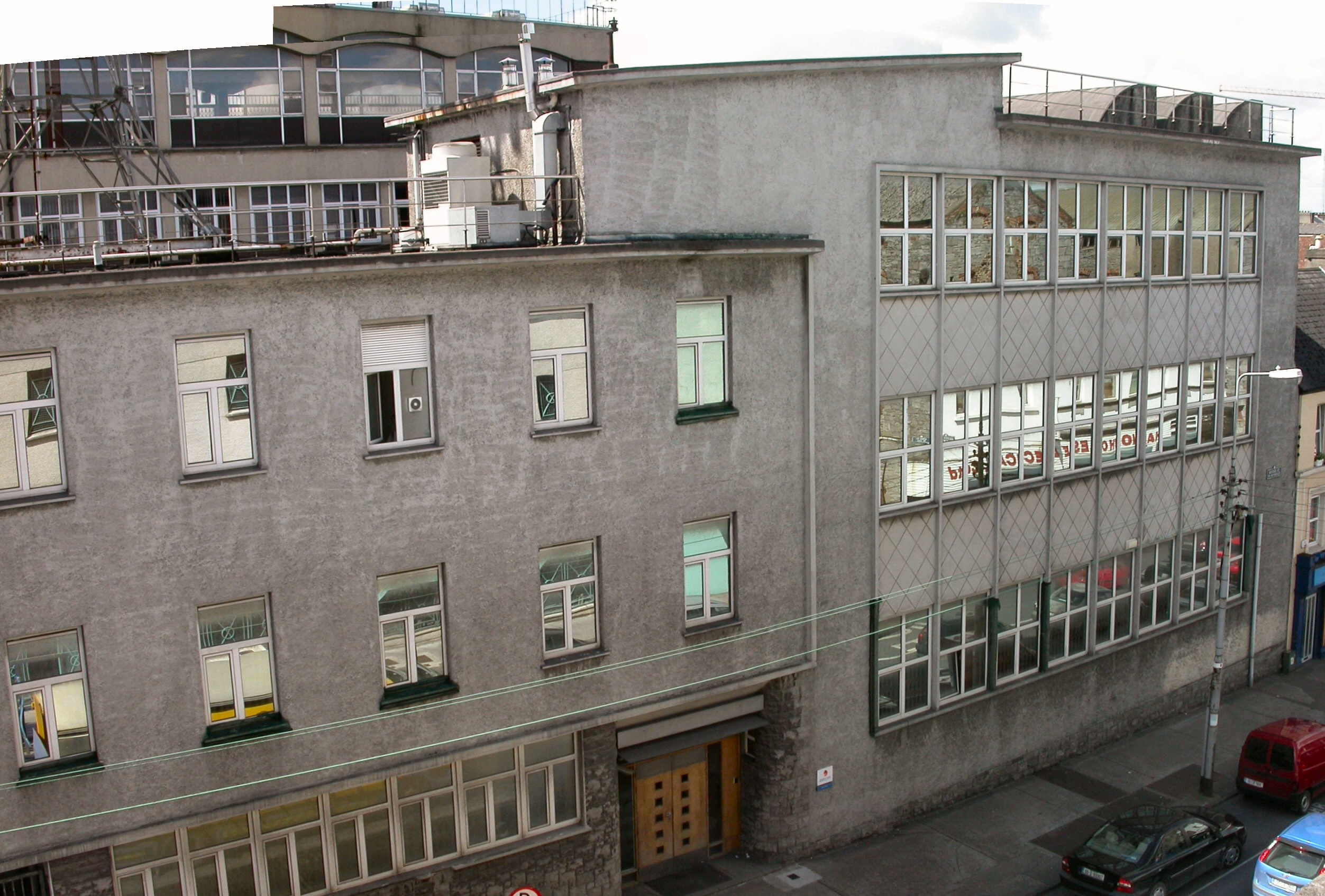
Eir telephone exchange in Roches Street, Limerick

Eir operates the largest fixed-line telecommunications network in Ireland, under licence from the Commission for Communications Regulation (ComReg). Most homes and businesses in the state are dependent on their network. A range of telecommunications services is provided on the network including Business IP, its MPLS platform. Eir have also completed a wholly owned fibre network ring around Northern Ireland and another around Belfast. Their ISP division, Eir Net, provides dial-up services, as well as broadband services (see broadband roll-out, below). Any alarm-monitoring products using SMS are "hardcoded" to work with Eir's SMSC, so will not work on Digiweb, BT, Smart, UPC or Magnet phone networks. DECT SMS handsets are also preprogrammed for Eir's SMSC. Any competing phone service that is not just carrier pre-selection (CPS) of Eir must provide their own SMSC, but even when they do, consumers may be unable to migrate from Eir due to SMSC numbers in equipment that cannot be reprogrammed.

Eir's mobile arm provides a full range of 2G, 3G, 4G and 5G-based mobile communication services throughout Ireland. Its GSM network operates at 1800 MHz and 900 MHz ranges, as the earlier GSM licences fully utilised the 900 MHz band. GPRS and EDGE data services are also available. Eir mobile provide both bill pay (contract) and prepay (non-contract) plans and has approximately 19% of the Irish mobile market, with 1,032,000 cellular subscribers on the Eir Mobile network. The company has used EDGE technology on its network and has received a 3G (UMTS) license, formally removed from Eir's competitor, Smart Telecom.

As an operator with significant market power, Eir is required to provide a number of wholesale products to other operators and to switch calls onto other phone networks. Many broadband products offered by other operators are resales of the Eir product.

== History ==
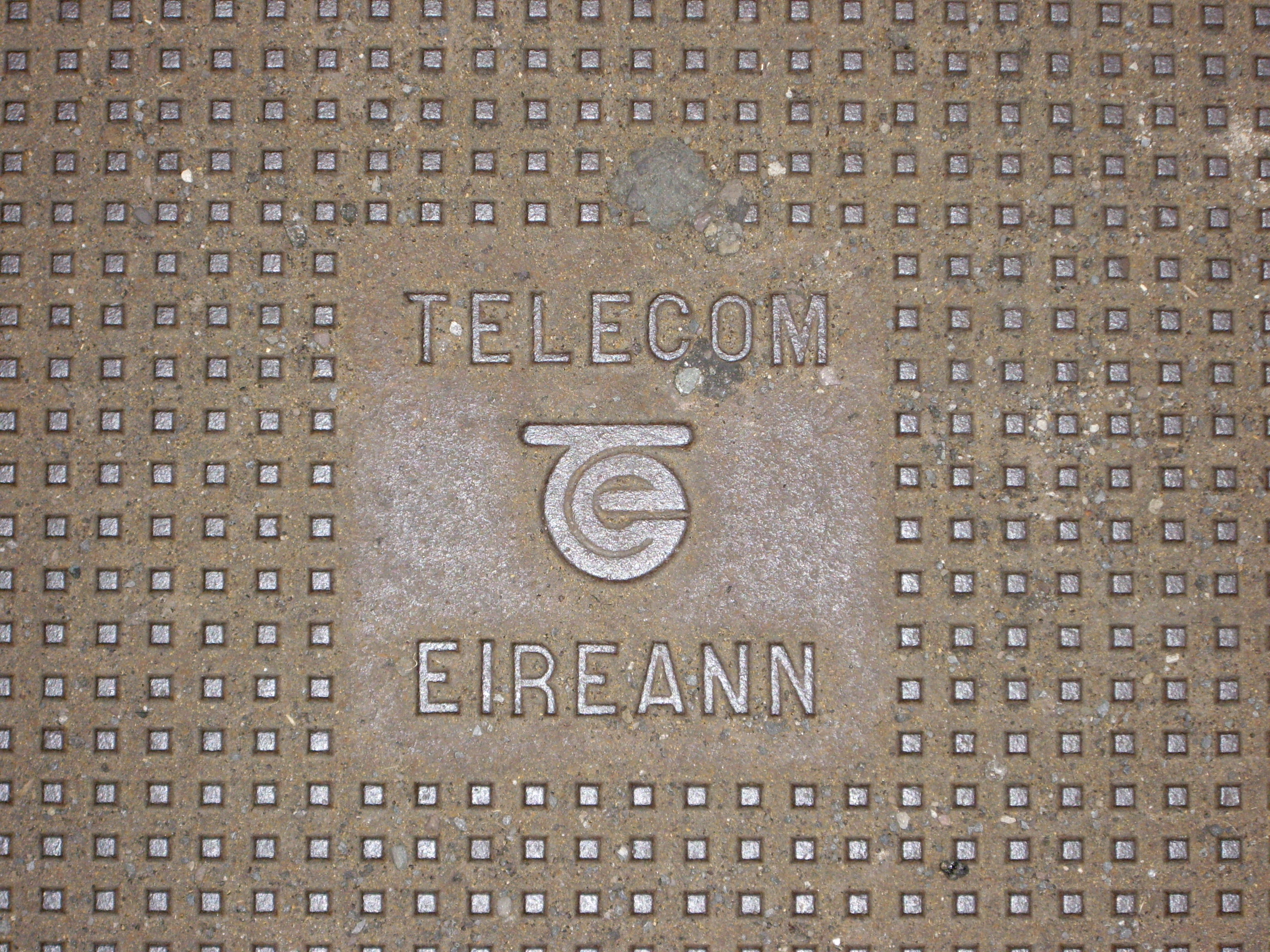
Telecom Éireann manhole cover

The company was formed in 1984 as Bord Telecom Éireann, under the Posts and Telecommunications Act 1983.

Telecom Éireann was privatised; the process began in 1995, and by July 1999 the government had disposed of virtually all of its shareholding. This was very controversial and subject to much debate. Eircom plc was then floated on the Irish, London and New York Stock Exchanges on 8 July 1999, and small/first-time investors were encouraged by the Irish Government to buy shares. The share price was set at €3.90, later reaching a high of €4.80, a 23% increase. Those initial investors who held onto their shares, until July 2000, received a 4% bonus-share allocation.

The Eircom flotation is considered to have been an example of a stock market bubble — after the initial hype of the flotation died down, the stock price fell rapidly. Many of the 500,000 small investors were angered by the significant financial loss they incurred, blaming the government for not sufficiently warning them of the risks inherent in stock-market investment.

Although EU laws required the opening of the Irish telecommunications market, Ireland had a derogation from competition until 2003. Eircom was designated by ComReg as the organisation with ownership of the National Directory Database (NDD) and a Universal White Pages (UWP) directory; the unit within Eircom responsible for providing these was the National Directory Information Unit (NDIU). In December 2019 this agreement expired and ComReg extended the management of the NDD to all current providers, Eir did not declined to propose extending the agreement. A Dutch company PortingXS became the subsequent manager of the NDD as it was the only provider that flagged an interest.

From 1991 to 2013, Eir's subsidiaries included Phonewatch, then known as Eircom Phonewatch, which provides home monitoring services, monitored burglar-alarms, fire alarms, CCTV systems, and medical alert devices. In May 2013, it announced that Phonewatch had been sold to Oslo-based company, Sector Alarm.

From 1999 to 2006 sponsored RTE Weather and from 2000 to 2008, Eircom sponsored the League of Ireland.

=== Disposal of Eircell, going private and reflotation ===
Logo of Eircom, used from 1999 until 16 September 2015

In 2001, Eircom sold its mobile subsidiary Eircell to Vodafone. The company was transferred to a separate entity, Eircell 2000 plc which was then sold to Vodafone through a share swap. Eircom shareholders got Eircell shares in a 1000/1 ratio. The conversion rate was then 0.9478 Vodafone shares for every 2 Eircell 2000 shares. This left the Eircom shareholder with shares in both Eircom and Vodafone.

After the sale of Eircell, Eircom itself was believed to be undervalued and became the subject of a bidding war between two consortia: the E-Island consortium headed by Denis O'Brien, and the Valentia Consortium headed by Tony O'Reilly, the chairman of Independent News and Media. Eventually in November 2001, the company agreed to a recommended offer of €1.335 per Eircom share. Eircom Plc was delisted from the stock exchange, became Eircom Limited, a private limited company by shares and a subsidiary of Valentia, and O'Reilly took the reins as Executive chairman.

On 19 March 2004, the company returned to the stock market (although the company being listed, Eircom Group plc, was in fact a new holding company, and was registered in England and Wales rather than in Ireland). The company floated at €1.55 a share, but dipped on initial trading before recovering to trade above its float price.

=== Return to mobile, acquisition of Meteor ===
In early 2005, several Irish newspapers reported that Meteor Mobile Communications, the third mobile phone operator, was up for sale by its owners, Western Wireless. It was considered that this afforded Eircom an opportunity to re-enter the mobile communications market. On 9 July 2005, The Irish Times reported three bidders for Meteor: Eircom, Smart Telecom, and a consortium led by Denis O'Brien. On 14 July 2005 RTÉ News reported on their business website that Denis O'Brien had withdrawn from bidding, and that it was understood that Eircom was the top bidder at €410 million. On 21 July, it was announced that Smart Telecom had also withdrawn, leaving Eircom as the sole bidder. Eircom announced the agreement to purchase it on 25 July 2005 at a cost of €420m. As of 31 December 2012, Meteor had over 1,086,000 customers and a market share of 20%, offering both GSM and 3G mobile telephony and broadband services.

In May 2006, Eircom announced its sale to the Australian investment group Babcock & Brown as part of a deal worth €2.4 billion. The Employee Share Ownership Trust, which represents workers at the company, was to remain a minority shareholder. The sale was approved by shareholders on 26 July 2006, and at close of business on 17 August 2006, the shares were delisted from the Official Lists of the Irish Stock Exchange and the London Stock Exchange, ending Eircom's second period on the stock markets. The same day, Phillip Nolan resigned as chief executive of Eircom, and on 1 September Rex Comb was officially named as the new CEO. Tony O'Reilly resigned as chairman and was replaced by Pierre Danon, previously of BT Group plc and JP Morgan Chase. Babcock & Brown have since collapsed as a company and their BCM vehicle, which owns over 50% of Eir, broke all ties with the former parent and rebranded themselves as Eircom Holdings Limited.

Eircom was also successful in bidding for a 4G LTE License from Comreg, which permitted Meteor and eMobile to launch 4G services in 2013.

=== Examinership ===
Eircom notified the public in February 2012 that they had decided to no longer honour their debt, had entered default status and would not continue as a going concern. Eircom gave notification that they had cancelled a mandatory interest payment on their publicly traded senior corporate bond, then due to mature in 2016.

On 29 March 2012, a number of companies within the Eircom Group presented a petition to the Irish High Court for the appointment of an examiner. The examinership lasted until 11 June 2012; the restructuring removed €1.7 billion of debt from the balance sheet, a reduction of 40% of group debt.

In September 2015, Eircom announced that it would re-brand as eir as part of a new imaging campaign developed by Moving Brands. Described as being "dynamic and modern", the new brand was adopted across most of Eircom's businesses (excluding Meteor), and an advertising campaign was introduced to promote the new name and slogan, "Live life on eir".

In December 2017, Iliad SA announced that it would be acquiring a 32.9% stake in the company with an option to take control of the Irish operator through a call option, which is exercisable in 2024.

=== Acquisition of Setanta Sports and launch of Eir Sport ===
Eir Sport commenced broadcasting on 5 July 2016 following the takeover of Setanta Sports by Eir. Two Irish commercial stations, Eir Sport 1 (formerly Setanta Ireland) and Eir Sport 2 (formerly Setanta Sports 1), join BT Sport 1, BT Sport 2, BT Sport Europe and BT Sport ESPN to make up the 6 channel Eir Sport pack. Setanta Sports was formed in 1990 to facilitate the broadcasting of Irish sporting events to international audiences.

In May 2021, it was announced that eir Sport would cease operations by the end of 2021.

== Businesses ==
=== Mobile ===
Eir operates a full service mobile telephone network across Ireland providing full 5G connectivity as well as 4G, 3G and 2G services.

Eircom purchased Ireland's 3rd mobile network, Meteor in 2005 initially operating it as a separate brand, with a secondary brand eMobile used to complement Eircom landline products.

The Meteor brand was subsequently dropped, and the mobile network became a core part of the main Eir brand.

=== Eir Business Ireland ===
Eir Business Ireland is the corporate and SME operations in the Ireland. Eir Business sponsored Irish sporting events including the "Dubai Duty Free Irish Open" in the K Club. It secured business contracts with Druids Glen a Golf Resort in County Wicklow. Customers include University College Dublin (UCD), Ordnance Survey Ireland and Dublin City Council.

=== Eir Business NI ===
Eir Business NI is the name of the company's operations in Northern Ireland. With the division based in Belfast, Eir own and operate a fibre-optic network ring around Belfast and Northern Ireland, linking into the national Eir Network in the rest of Ireland. Eir Business NI have won significant contracts thus far, the largest being the €70m "Network NI" contract for the Northern Ireland Civil Service, with other significant contracts as operator of choice for Northern Ireland Schools and Libraries, NIE, Viridian, Wright Group, Chain Reaction Cycles and many more large enterprise brands. The company in Northern Ireland provides services to local government and SME sectors.

=== Television ===
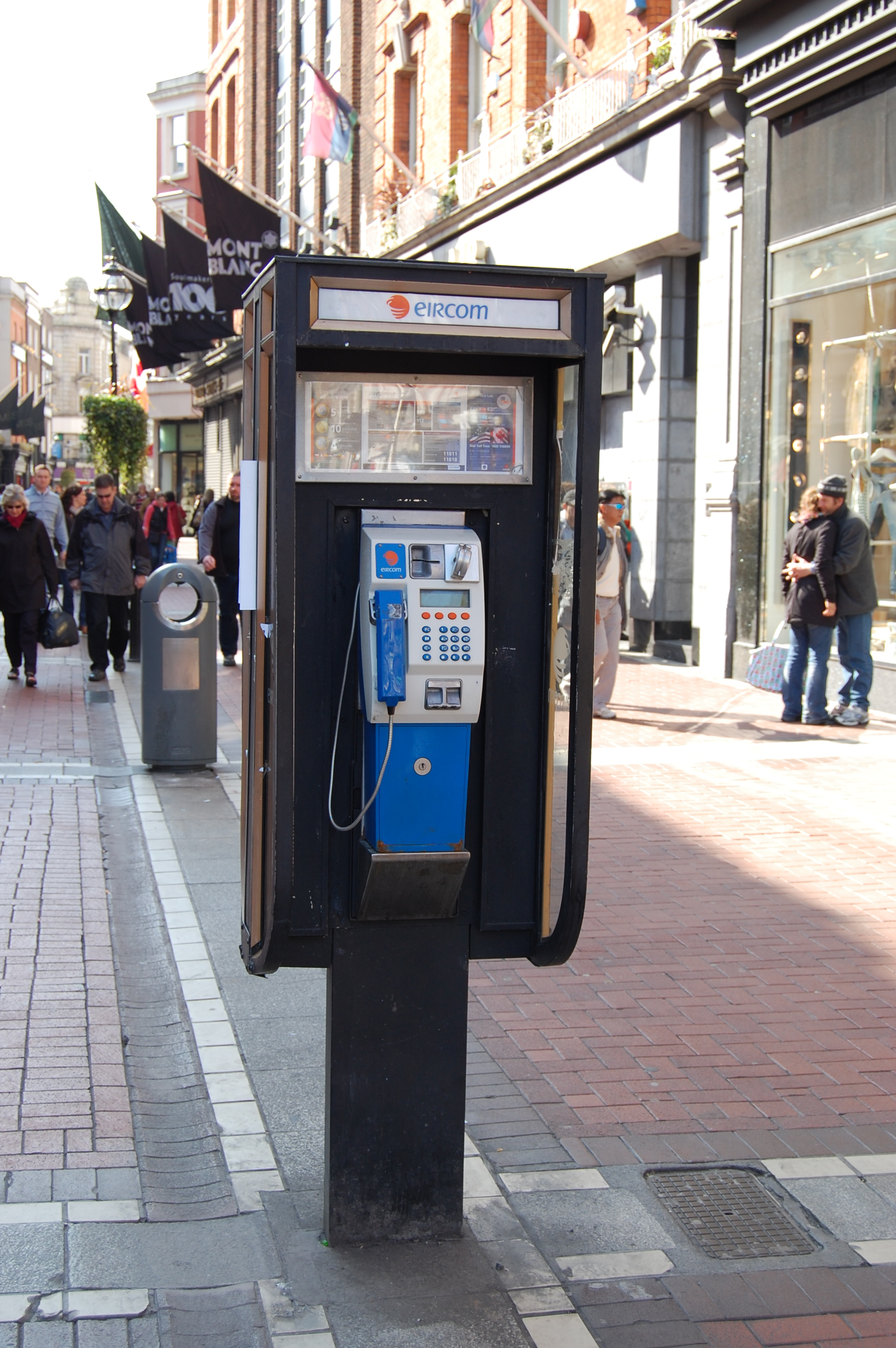
Eircom phonebooth in Grafton Street, Dublin (2007)

As Telecom Éireann, Eir owned 75% of the cable operator Cablelink (the other 25% was owned by RTÉ). Cablelink was sold to NTL in 1999 and subsequently bought by UPC.

As Eircom, Eir joined a consortium with TV3 Group, Arqiva, and Setanta Sports called OneVision to apply for the Commercial licence for DTT. On 1 May 2009 Fintan Drury, chairman of the OneVision consortium, announced that OneVision was to enter negotiations with the BCI, with the view to take over operations of the Irish pay DTT service. It was hoped that the launch of OneVision would happen in late 2010/early 2011 at a proposed operation cost of €40 million. OneVision aspired to offer 23 channels coinciding with the free-to-air channels. However, OneVision subsequently dropped out of negotiations with the BCI.

In 2013 Eir began providing a TV service along with its Eir Fibre service called Eir Vision.

== Competition ==
Eir retains the largest share of the fixed line market in Ireland, with 27.6% of the broadband market, 32.7% of the FTTP market, 38.9% of fixed line retail and wholesale revenues and 44.3% of fixed line voice subscriptions, with competition from Virgin Media Ireland, BT Ireland, Vodafone Ireland, Sky Ireland and a number of smaller players including Digiweb.

The company is the third largest player in the Irish mobile market, with 23% of the market, behind Three Ireland 29.3% and Vodafone Ireland 33.9% (These figures exclude mobile broadband and machine to machine communications).

== Controversy ==
After the privatisation of Telecom Éireann, the highly profitable mobile phone division, Eircell, was sold to Vodafone. Some consider this act to be asset stripping by the large investors with interests in what later became Eircom.

Eircom announced in June 2007 that from 30 July line rental charges would increase by €1.18 bringing line rental charges - already the most expensive in Europe - to a total of €25.36 per month for a PSTN analogue line, one source indicated it was the highest line-rental charge in the world. Also announced was an increase of between 4.8 and 4.9% on local and national calls.

In March 2011, Eircom pleaded guilty to a breach of the Data Protection Act at the Dublin District Court.

On 12 April 2018, Eir announced that they would cut 750 jobs. This would mean that 10,000 jobs would have been lost since its peak number of jobs of 13,000 The job cuts came just days after the takeover of the company by French entrepreneur Xavier Niel.

=== Copyright enforcement ===
==== Blocking of the Pirate Bay ====
On 21 April 2008, Eircom rejected claims by four major record companies that it, as the largest broadband internet service provider in the state, must bear some liability for the illegal free downloading of music by computer users. Eir have thus far managed to come to an agreement with the companies involved, stating that they will be working in conjunction with these companies to prevent large amounts of copyrighted material being shared through the ISP. This in turn raised concerns over internet privacy, since presumably this would be enforced through the monitoring of IP traffic associated with Eir's customers. It is not known whether or not this bears any significance on the Meteor Mobile network, a mobile broadband supplier acquired by Eir. Eircom has reportedly signed an out-of-court settlement with said companies and are initiating a program to clamp down on piracy, within their network, by instituting an IP monitoring service, accessible by the Irish Recorded Music Association (IRMA) and allowing up to three warnings before disconnection of service.

As of 5 December 2013, Eir users who try to access The Pirate Bay receive the following message:

"On the 24 July 2009, an Order was made by the High Court requiring Eircom to block or otherwise disable access by its subscribers to the website thePirateBay.org, its related domain names, IP addresses and URLs. The Court was satisfied that on the basis of the evidence presented by the record companies that the PirateBay website is a website that facilitates the exchange of copyrighted sound recordings without the consent of the copyright owners.

"Eircom recognises the legitimate rights of the owners of copyrighted material and believes that individuals who share or download copyrighted material without the authorisation or the permission of the copyright owner are acting illegally.

"The Order further provides that should the PirateBay website content be legitimatised in the future, then Eircom has liberty to apply to the Court to have the Order vacated and access to the PirateBay website enabled."

==== Disconnection ====
Eircom agreed to a controversial deal with the IRMA to activate a "three strikes system" so that users would be banned from the Internet for seven days if they appeared to be downloading copyrighted content through peer to peer filesharing networks.

== See also ==
- Telecommunications in the Republic of Ireland
