= Wholesale line rental =

Type of telecommunications service

Wholesale line rental (WLR) is a service in which a telecommunications operator takes control of all the connections made through a telephone line from the native operator and collects the subscription fee from the subscribers.

With WLR the alternative telecoms provider buys a wholesale product from the incumbent (usually in conjunction with a wholesale call product such as CPS) and is then able to produce a single bill for the end user covering calls and line rental. Broadband services can also be provided by the WLR operator (and included in a single bill) if a separate wholesale DSL product is purchased from the incumbent, but this is optional.

As part of the United Kingdom PSTN switch-off, BT Openreach is due to retire its Wholesale Line Rental service. Providers are expected to implement Voice over IP to replace copper PSTN voice and ISDN connections.
