= Meteor (mobile network) =

Irish mobile telecommunications company

Meteor Mobile Communications
- Type: Private
- Industry: Mobile telecommunications
- Founded: 1998
- Defunct: 8 September 2017
- Fate: Merged into eir Mobile
- Successor: eir Mobile
- Headquarters: 1 Heuston South Quarter, Dublin, D08 A9RT, Ireland
- Key people: Larry Smith's (CEO) term ended in 2010 after Eircom and Meteor's retail operations were integrated.
- Products: Mobile phone network, mobile phone services & related goods
- Revenue: €388 million (June 2007)
- Number of employees: ~800
- Parent: eir
- Website: www.meteor.ie

Meteor Mobile Communications Limited was a GSM and UMTS mobile telecommunications company in Ireland. They operated a GSM/GPRS/EDGE/UMTS(HSPA+) and LTE cellular communications network under licence from the Commission for Communications Regulation (ComReg), and were the third entrant in the market, after Vodafone Ireland and Three Ireland. The company was a wholly owned subsidiary of Irish telecoms network Eir, having been purchased for €420m in 2005. Meteor was the only Irish owned mobile operator in Ireland. Meteor once issued new numbers with the prefix code 085. Since the introduction of full mobile number portability in Ireland, access codes have become less relevant as mobile telephone users may now retain their mobile telephone numbers when moving between mobile network operators. As a result, Meteor customers could have numbers starting with the codes 083, 085, 086, 087, or 089.

As of September 2008, Meteor had over 1 million customers, or 20% of the market.

== History ==
=== Award of licence ===
Logo used by the Meteor Consortium in bidding for the third GSM license in 1998/99

In 1998, the then Director of Telecommunications Regulation held a competition to award the third mobile telecommunications licence. Two companies submitted bids for the licence, Orange, then controlled by Hutchinson Whampoa, and Meteor Mobile Communications (consisting at that point of Western Wireless, RF Communications Limited, and TWG Ireland LLC). On 19 June 1998 it was announced that Meteor had been ranked first in the competition. However, Orange took legal action against the Director to prevent the licence being awarded. This legal action ultimately failed and on 29 June 2000 Meteor were finally issued with the third mobile telecommunications licence.

=== Launch ===
Under Peter Quinn, Western Wireless International's VP of European Operations and Meteor's first CEO, Meteor launched on 22 February 2001, eight months after the High Court found in favor of their license over Orange. Uniquely, at the time, Billpay and prepaid customers could join without contracts and at the same cost of entry. Meteor slowly picked up a low (under 10%) share of the Irish market. However, they became profitable in their first year of operation and picked up much of the lucrative pre-paid market among teenagers, due to low SMS rates and promotions such as free Meteor-to-Meteor text messages.

In 2004, Western Wireless International bought out the remaining minority shareholders in the consortium, and it became a wholly owned subsidiary of that company.

=== Acquisition by eircom ===
Briefly used Meteor logo variant (2005–2007)

In early 2005 several Irish newspapers reported that Western Wireless had been approached with a view to selling Meteor. On 9 July 2005 it was reported by The Irish Times that there had been three bidders for Meteor: eircom, Smart Telecom, and a consortium led by Denis O'Brien. It was considered that the probability of eircom winning, was looking increasingly unlikely due to their heavy debt of approximately €1.9 billion. It seemed unlikely they could afford it, should the price have topped €400 million. However, on 14 July 2005, RTÉ News reported on their business website that Denis O'Brien had withdrawn from bidding, and that it was understood that eircom was the top bidder at €410m. On 21 July it was announced that Smart Telecom had also withdrawn, leaving eircom as the sole bidder. On 25 July eircom announced that it had agreed to purchase the company for €420m. On 18 November 2005 the Competition Authority approved, subject to conditions (primarily, that separate accounts continue to be published for Meteor). The purchase was completed on 23 November 2005.

== Rapid growth ==
In a report by eircom, Meteor had gained an 18.9% share of the mobile market in Ireland, with a customer base of over 962,000 of which over 100,000 (12%) were post paid subscribers under the Meteor BillPay brand. The company's subscriber base had increased to over one million as of September 2008. Meteor accounted for 66% of the overall growth of the Irish mobile market in the year to September 2006. The company worked closely with Eircom in upgrading its billing systems and deploying EDGE and 3G technology on its network. With the developments in eircom's acceptance of the fourth 3G licence from ComReg, Meteor was obliged to have 33% of the population covered with commercial roll out of 3G services in October 2007. Meteor also signed a deal with T-Mobile UK which saw T-Mobile UK contract customers being offered a flat rate £0.25 for calls made while roaming on the Meteor network in Ireland. On 21 September 2006 Meteor announced the abolition of charges to receive calls while in the UK, by signing a deal with T-Mobile UK.

== Appointment of examiner ==
On 29 March 2012, a number of companies within the eir group, including Meteor, petitioned the Irish High Court for the appointment of an examiner.

== Products and services ==
Meteor initially started out as a value-driven mobile service offering customers basic mobile voice telephony and text-based SMS services to mostly Pay and Go customers.

The company offered mobile services, such as MMS, GPRS, EDGE and 3G through their Pay as You Go and Bill Pay brands. In 2009 Meteor launched Bill Pay Lite. It offered short contracts and low monthly fees.

In February 2009 Meteor launched Broadband To Go, its mobile broadband offering. The service offered internet at HSDPA speeds and was available to Bill Pay and Pay as You Go customers. There were 3 different products on bill pay, with download allowances of 5GB, 10GB and 15GB. The Pay as you go service offered 7.5GB.

Meteor Mobile Internet was the company's mobile internet based services, offering access to the mobile internet, realtones, full track music downloads and other content available for download to existing customers.

Meteor Business was the company's division focusing on business customers. They offered services such as Mobile Email using Visto technology, Microsoft Windows Mobile Email and other products.

=== 4G - LTE ===
Meteor (along with its sister company, eMobile), provided 4G. 4G was originally only available in Dublin, Carlow, Cork, Clare, Limerick, Galway, Mullingar, Athlone and Dundalk. Meteor claimed to have 90% 4G population coverage across Ireland and had planned to cover the country with 90% geographic coverage by April 2017.

== eir Mobile (MNO) (former MVNO) ==
As part of their mobile strategy eir and Meteor also launched eir Mobile aimed at the older residential and business market. This was complementary to the now discontinued Meteor brand (mainly used by younger residential wireless customers). eir Mobile was a mobile virtual network operator MVNO which used the Meteor Network for its services to residential and business customers, to complement the residential and business mobile services offered by Meteor. It is now a Mobile network operator with 96% 4G coverage, as well as 99% 3G population coverage as of September 2017, when it became the successor to Meteor Mobile.

== Network ==
Meteor previously had a national roaming agreement with O_{2} Ireland which meant that, only on the westernmost areas of Ireland (where Meteor did not have coverage), a Meteor customer could use O_{2} Ireland's network at no extra charge. This deal expired in February 2007. The final arrangement allowed Meteor customers access to the Vodafone Ireland network on the western-seabord of Ireland.

Like all other Irish operators, Meteor held a UMTS licence. They had offered nationwide 3G services from 2007, but the Meteor 3G network was available to 33% of the Irish population (this included the four cities of Dublin, Cork, Limerick, Galway and other regional centres) with very limited geographic coverage, around 15% by 2013.

They also offered GPRS (2.5G) and EDGE (2.75G) services. Their parent eir won a bid for the final 3G licence, when their parent, eircom accepted this, because, Smart Mobile Ltd. was unable to pay for the license. Meteor continued to add EDGE capabilities to their then existing 2G network. In order to comply with the terms of licence, Meteor launched stage one (10% 3G population coverage area) from their UMTS/HSDPA Network on the end of October 2007, with the second phase having gone live to customers at the end of September 2008.

Meteor's network also offered 4G services, which covered 96% of the Irish population. Meteor had Ireland's second largest 4G footprint after Vodafone.

The legal transfer of licence for UMTS services from Meteor's parent, eircom, was officially authorised on 26 June 2008 taking effect the following day.

== Meteor Ireland Music Awards ==
Meteor sponsored Ireland's national music awards annually, becoming known at one point as The Meteors, until their cancellation in 2011.

== Sponsorship ==
Meteor sponsored RTÉ One's travel show No Frontiers and the second season of TV3's The Apprentice. They have since removed their sponsorship of The Apprentice, while RTÉ have since replaced No Frontiers with a new holiday show, Getaways.

== Copyright Enforcement ==
On the 1st of September 2009, Meteor and eircom began regulating access to the Pirate Bay with a "three strike" system, in compliance with a High Court order issued to eircom as a result of a court case between themselves and the Irish Recorded Music Association. This system was challenged by the Data Protection Commissioner (DPC) in 2010, but was overruled by the High Court. The DPC issued an order to eircom to halt this system in 2011, citing a ruling by the European Court of Justice. They continued to voluntarily completely block access to the Pirate Bay for some time after, however eircom does not block the Pirate Bay as of 2024.

== See also ==
- List of Irish companies
