= Carrier preselect =

Carrier preselect is a term relating to the telecommunications industry. It is a method of routing calls for least-cost routing (LCR) without the need for programming of PBX telephone system.

This is the process whereby a telephone subscriber whose telephone line is maintained by one company, usually a former monopoly provider (e.g. BT), can choose to have some of their calls automatically routed across a different telephone company's network (e.g. Talk Talk) without needing to enter a special code or special equipment.

== See also ==
- Local loop unbundling
- Wholesale line rental
