= Commission for Communications Regulation =

Irish communications regulator

- 160

State agency of the Department of Culture, Communications and Sport overview
- Formed: 1 December 2002
- Preceding State agency of the Department of Culture, Communications and Sport: Office of Telecommunications Regulation
- Jurisdiction: Ireland
- Headquarters: 1 Dockland Central, Guild Street, Dublin 1, D01 E4X0
- State agency of the Department of Culture, Communications and Sport executives: Garrett Blaney, Commissioner; Robert Mourik, Commissioner
- Key document: Communications Regulation Act, 2002
- Website: ComReg website

The Commission for Communications Regulation (ComReg) (Irish: An Coimisiún um Rialáil Cumarsáide) is the general communications regulator for Ireland, covering almost all possible types of communications.

Founded on 1 December 2002, ComReg took over from the Office of the Director of Telecommunications Regulation (ODTR), amongst other bodies. The ODTR was established in 1997 to take over the licensing and regulatory functions of the Minister for Transport, Energy and Communication which related primarily to broadcasting and communications. The first (and only) Director of Telecommunications Regulation was Etain Doyle, who was subsequently appointed Chairperson of ComReg, on its establishment.

Under the Communications Regulation Act, 2002 the Minister for Communications, Marine, and Natural Resources appoints the chairperson and up to two other commissioners of ComReg. Currently the commissioners are Garrett Blaney, Helen Dixon and Robert Mourik. Sectors regulated by ComReg include post, telecoms, internet, cable television, terrestrial television, radio and domain name under the Communications Regulation Act, 2002 (No. 20 of 2002), S.I. No. 510 of 2002 Communications Regulation Act 2002 (Establishment Day) Order 2002 and other acts. For a full list of legislation underpinning ComReg's responsibilities.

ComReg set prices, allocate frequencies, and issue licenses to those involved in these sectors and provides statistical data, consumer product price comparisons to assist consumers in achieving value for money on a fair basis. In relation to terrestrial television and radio, the commission acts in conjunction with Coimisiún na Meán (formerly the Broadcasting Authority of Ireland). After the enactment of the Broadcasting Act 2009 RTÉ and TG4 authorities were disbanded and now come under Coimisiún na Meán's remit.

ComReg is also tasked with enforcing wireless telegraphy legislation, in particular the Wireless Telegraphy Act, 1926, in relation to use of the radio spectrum, which includes actions against pirate radio stations, distributors of mobile phone repeaters and other unlicensed users of radio spectrum.

== See also ==
- Communications in Ireland
