= Giffgaff =

British mobile virtual network operator

Giffgaff Limited
- Logo since 2 November 2026
- Type: Subsidiary
- Industry: Telecommunications
- Founded: November 25, 2009; 16 years ago in Slough, England
- Founder: Gav Thompson
- Headquarters: Reading, England
- Area served: United Kingdom
- Key people: Kate Dohaney (CEO)
- Products: Contract and PAYG telephonic services. Phone sales. Broadband.
- Services: Mobile telephony
- Revenue: ▲£559.1 million (2022); £524.4 million (2021)
- Net income: ▲£66.3 million (2022); £42.6 million (2021)
- Number of employees: 300+
- Parent: Virgin Media O2
- Website: giffgaff.com

Giffgaff Limited is a mobile virtual network operator (MVNO) and internet service provider (ISP) in the United Kingdom. It utilises the O2 UK network and Virgin Media broadband network as a wholly owned subsidiary and online-only flanker brand of Virgin Media O2. The stylised 'giffgaff' brand was founded by Gav Thompson a former marketing executive for Telefónica UK and was launched online only, on 25 November 2009.

== Products and services ==
At launch, giffgaff's first product was a prepaid SIM card providing all standard 2G and 3G mobile phone services and charging on a pay-as-you-go basis. Following this, giffgaff announced bundles of minutes, texts, and data, called "goodybags". The idea for bundles emerged from the community forums.

In June 2012, it was announced that customers could renew "goodybags" automatically via a PayPal account when saved on their platform payment profile.

In 2011, giffgaff added data-only tetherable plans called "gigabags" to their lineup of products. Gigabags were officially retired in 2018, as part of product restructuring. giffgaff allow tethering to other devices, using their bundled data allowances.

In March 2014, giffgaff announced that it would add a line of 4G LTE "goodybags" with purchase available starting April 2014.

In May 2014, giffgaff announced that they were now an official Apple carrier, which was closely followed by another announcement that they would soon be stocking iPhones in their online shop – this would unlock options on iPhones that would have normally been locked for users, including tethering and voicemail options. iPhone devices went on sale starting 4 June 2014, to accompany a wide range of manufacturers including Samsung handsets. Refurbished devices have become a purchase option, with a giffgaff 12-month+ warranty included. On 2 November 2020, giffgaff announced that they are terminating their business relationship with RateSetter, the former peer-to-peer lender, now owned by Metro Bank. giffgaff's current phone loan initiative is with Klarna Bank Ab, branded as Klarna, a Swedish bank that provides financial services.

From 2020, all goodybags now include unlimited minutes and texts to standard UK numbers. Full speed data allowances range from 1GB to unlimited. The prices listed are between £6 - £35 per month and are reviewed periodically. In August 2020, the company launched its 9GB golden goodybag to compete directly with its own 6GB goodybag product, both priced at £10. In August 2021, the company launched a third £10 product, their "Student Golden Goodybag", debuting at 13 GB of data, later increasing to 15 GB. The Student Golden goodybag was retired in July 2022 after one year.

To be eligible to purchase from the selection of "golden goodybags", the member must register a bank payment method and agree to recurring monthly purchases. There is no ongoing commitment and the recur can be switched off or cancelled at will. On 20 October 2020, giffgaff introduced their "unlimited golden goodybag" priced at £35 a month. At the same time, they announced future 5G access for customers, initially on golden goodybag products, later extended across all products.

In January 2021, the goodybag range was expanded to give more data.

From 24 February 2021, using pay-as-you-go data without a "goodybag" doubled in price from 5p MB to 10p MB.

In April 2022, giffgaff announced a UK price freeze for the remainder of 2022. In September 2022, giffgaff announced their UK price freeze would be extended until the end of 2023.

In April 2023, giffgaff announced a major departure away from their previous business model by introducing 18-month pre-pay contracts for monthly bundles of data, calls and texts named "good contracts". For the first time, customers would be financially penalised for terminating their bundle purchases early, prior to the expiry of their entire contract term.

In April 2025, giffgaff announced a move into broadband. 500 initial trialists were recruited and given £100 and a year's broadband for £10 a month in exchange for their views on the early product. A limited launch in September 2025 saw giffgaff broadband rolled out in parts of the northeast and northwest of England. The giffgaff broadband service offers three speeds of monthly rolling plan, starting at £34 a month for 200Mbps of full fibre. giffgaff broadband includes symmetrical speeds as standard, with no bundles or phone line, and is installed by Virgin Media engineers.

=== Customer service ===
giffgaff does not operate customer service phone helplines. Non-account-specific problems are raised via an online community system and are answered by other giffgaff members in exchange for "payback points" (a virtual currency). Account-specific queries are directed to "agents", who are contracted by giffgaff and partnered through Firstsource Solutions to administer all their account matters. There is a second tier dedicated complaints team, who respond to complaints made by email and from a recorded voicemail. Written responses can take five business days. As of March 2023, the contact hours for giffgaff's agents are 8am to 10pm on weekdays, and 8am to 8pm on weekends and public holidays.

As of September 2025, giffgaff uses the same customer support service for its mobile and broadband members, and have added a live chat option to speak with an agent.

In late October 2026, giffgaff emailed its customers to alert them to a change in branding, with the logo losing its "joined up" elements and now incorporating the arrow of a signpost on the final F of the name, as well as a change in corporate colour from mustard to light green. This was expected to take effect in the run-up to Black Friday (shopping). The email said: "We’ll still be the giffgaff you know and love. We’re not changing what we believe. Just how clearly we show it." The company did not provide a web link to set out the forthcoming changes but its previous branding is explained here.

Educators giffgaff use remote workers as full and part-time community moderators that they call 'Educators' who monitor and patrol the online community forum.

=== Payback ===
giffgaff offers payback points to members who recruit other members and who provide customer service to the giffgaff community. Previously members who suggested ideas on their giffgaff Labs platform (which closed in 2021) also received payback points. Payback points can be exchanged for real money, added as airtime credit, or donated to five charities (this option was added in 2020) nominated by members and paid out biannually in June and December. giffgaff promises to match their members' charitable donations, pound for pound. giffgaff itself is an old Scottish word for 'mutual giving' and the company states they attempt to maintain that ethos as much as possible.

==== Super Recruiters ====
When giffgaff members have recruited 15 or more new members to join the network, they are permanently promoted to super recruiter status, earning potentially larger rewards depending on their recruit's second and subsequent payments to giffgaff and ongoing member retention. Super recruiters are also eligible to receive enhanced benefits, such as dedicated email support, marketing materials, phone calls with employees, and visits to giffgaff's HQ.

== Ownership ==
On 3 November 2025, the corporate brand Virgin Media O2 issued a press release confirming Kate Dohaney's appointment as the new CEO of giffgaff with effect from early December 2025, taking over from the incumbent, Ash Schofield.

giffgaff is the wholly owned subsidiary of Telefónica UK Ltd, which trades under the Brand-name of Virgin Media O2 within the United Kingdom.

As part of the merger of Liberty Global and Telefónica's UK-based assets, giffgaff's parent company, Telefónica UK, operate their business within the 50-50 joint venture framework of both companies, while giffgaff remains wholly owned by Telefónica UK.

== Network service and infrastructure ==
=== 4G ===
As of September 2015, all of giffgaff's "goodybags" come with 4G data included at no extra cost. If the user doesn't have a 4G ready device or is not in a 4G area, the device will connect to O2's 3G or 2G network instead.

=== 5G ===
giffgaff implemented 5G on their "Golden Goodybag" range using their new 5G SIMs on 7 January 2021. Initially, only new 5G SIMs would work on the technology, but later access was extended to existing 4G SIM cards.

giffgaff's 5G, like all their network services, runs on O2's network. O2 rolled out their 5G network access to O2 customers in October 2019.

=== Full fibre broadband ===
giffgaff's full fibre broadband is installed by Virgin Media engineers, and uses fibre technology on nexfibre XGS-PON network. The rest of the member experience, like care, is run by giffgaff technology and people.

== Awards ==
In November 2010, giffgaff won the Forrester Groundswell Award and was later nominated for the 'Marketing Society's Brand of the Year' award, losing to the department store John Lewis. In December 2010, giffgaff won the 'Most Innovative Community Award' at the Social CRM Customer Excellence Awards.

In June 2012, giffgaff was named the Best MVNO at the Mobile Industry Awards.

In 2014 and 2015, giffgaff won the Which? best telecom services provider award. In 2018, giffgaff was a runner-up in the Best Utilities Provider of the Year Awards.

In 2019, Which? reviewed 13 mobile network's customers. giffgaff was rated the best network by the sample surveyed.

Since 2016, giffgaff has regularly won the Uswitch Network of the Year award for 5 consecutive years. They also won three other Uswitch awards in 2019, for Best SIM Only Network, Best Network for Data, and Best PAYG Network.

In 2022 and 2023, according to Uswitch, the public voted for giffgaff as the network of the year.

== Controversies ==
=== Unlimited internet ===
After "goodybags" with unlimited internet allowance were introduced, complaints were made to the Advertising Standards Authority (ASA) from customers who were refused the further sale of unlimited plans. The reason given by giffgaff for their disconnection was a clause in the terms and conditions stating "[We may disconnect you] if you do anything ... which we reasonably think adversely impacts the service to other Giffgaff customers or may adversely affect the Network". The complaint was not upheld by the ASA who concluded that unlimited internet was advertised correctly. Giffgaff noted that their customer service agents had used the clause above incorrectly and promised to rectify this.

Giffgaff removed the "goodybags" in question and replaced their unlimited internet allowance with an "Always On" data allowance. This means that users will get 80 GB of full-speed data usage but after these 80 GB, will be speed-limited to 385 kbps between 8 am and midnight every day. However on 20 October 2020, the company reintroduced a version of their unlimited monthly (Golden) Goodybag to recurring customers, priced at £35.

=== Advertising campaigns ===
In May 2013, Giffgaff ran an online and television advertising campaign with the strapline "Don't be scared", which featured zombies converging on a village. Although the television advert appeared after the 9 pm watershed, the ASA received 105 complaints. The ASA did not uphold the complaints, stating that it was not in breach of any BCAP rules.

In October 2013, Giffgaff ran two adverts in an online campaign with the strapline "Different takes guts". The advert featured a crowd of people dressed in white in an empty swimming pool throwing guts at each other. The ASA upheld the complaints that the content was in violation of BCAP rules for harm and offence, and also BCAP rule 5.2 because the advert was not suitably age rated. It was recommended that the advert not appear again in its current form.

In August 2014, Giffgaff ran three adverts in an online campaign with the strapline "At home with your parents you're not the boss" which featured siblings being subjected to awkward situations with their parents, one of which was reported to the ASA and featured an adult son walking in on his parents as they were engaged in sexual intercourse. The ASA upheld the complaint that the content was in violation of BCAP rule 4.1 for harm and offence and recommended that the advert not appear again in its current form.
