= Virgin Media O2 =

British mass media and telecommunications company

VMED O2 UK Limited
- Trade name: Virgin Media O2
- Type: Joint venture
- Industry: Mass media; Telecommunications
- Founded: 1 June 2021; 5 years ago
- Headquarters: Reading, Berkshire, England, UK
- Area served: United Kingdom
- Key people: Lutz Schüler (CEO)
- Owners: Liberty Global (50%); Telefónica (50%)
- Subsidiaries: O2 UK; Virgin Media; Virgin Media Business
- Website: www.virginmediao2.co.uk

VMED O2 UK Limited, trading as Virgin Media O2, is a British mass media and telecommunications company based in Reading, Berkshire, England. The company was formed in June 2021 as a 50–50 joint venture between Liberty Global and Telefónica through the merger of their respective Virgin Media and O2 UK businesses, after approval by the Competition and Markets Authority.

O2 UK is one of the largest mobile networks in the United Kingdom by customer base, providing 5G, 4G, 3G (until late 2025), and 2G services, and Virgin Media is the main cable provider in the UK, providing cable (HFC) and fibre-to-the-premises broadband, cable television (Virgin TV), and cable landline services.

== History ==
=== Origins ===
==== O2 and acquisition by Telefónica ====
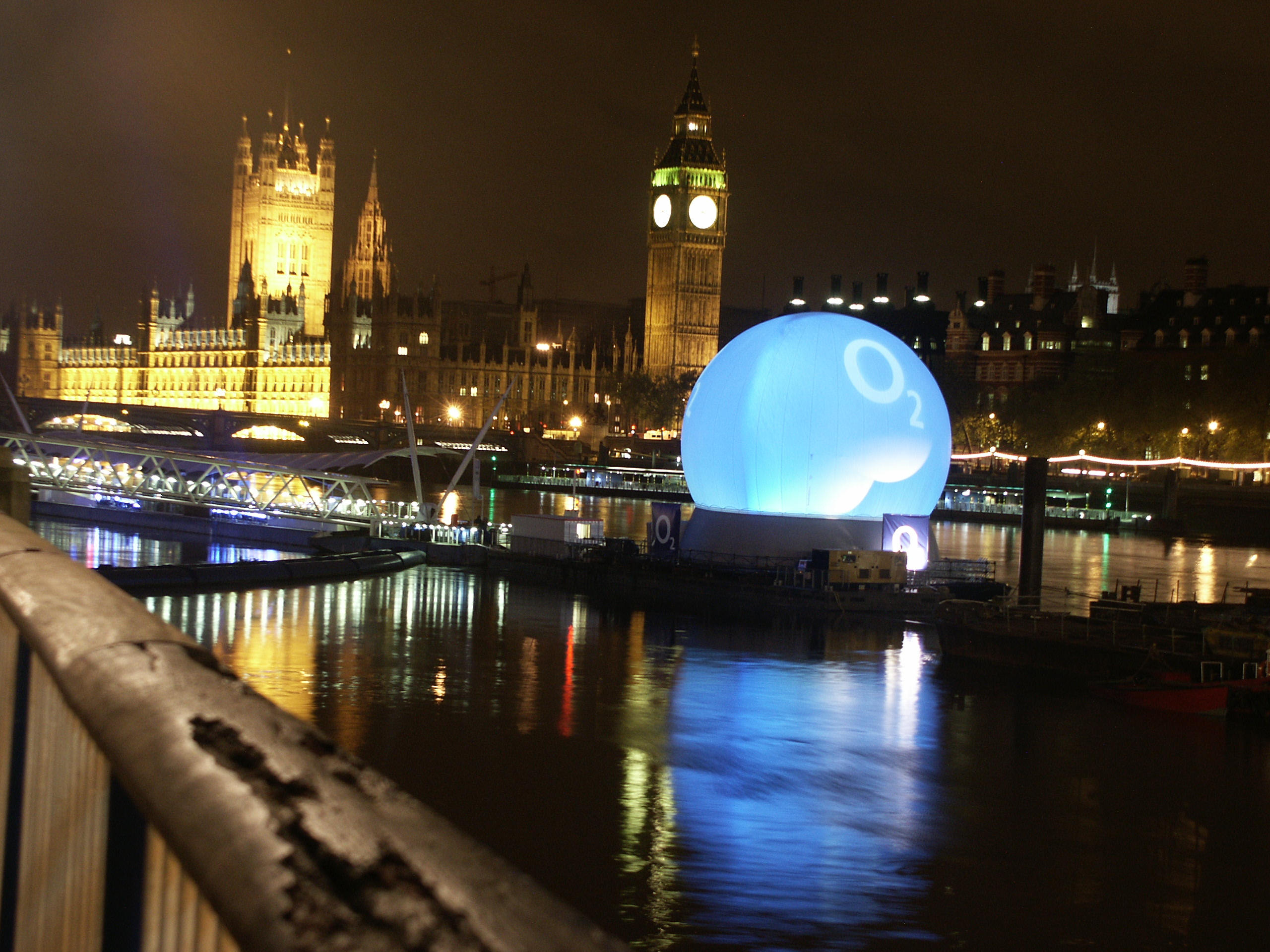
O2 brand launch event on the River Thames in 2002

O2 UK was formed in 1983 as Telecom Securicor Cellular Radio Limited, a joint venture between British Telecom (BT) (60%) and Securicor (40%). In 1985, it launched Cellnet, which alongside Vodafone was one of the two original mobile networks in the UK. BT later acquired Securicor's share, and rebranded the network as BT Cellnet. In 2001, British Telecom announced it would spin off its BT Wireless division, which included BT Cellnet, as mmO2 plc (later O2 plc), and introduced the O2 brand ahead of the demerger. The demerger was completed later that year, and in 2002, BT Cellnet was rebranded O2. O2 plc was acquired by Spanish multinational telecommunications company Telefónica in 2006.

==== NTL:Telewest, Virgin Mobile and Virgin.net ====
NTL:Telewest logo

In March 2006, cable telecommunications firms NTL and Telewest merged, having been in discussions since 2003, forming NTL:Telewest. In 2004, NTL had acquired ADSL and dial-up provider Virgin.net.

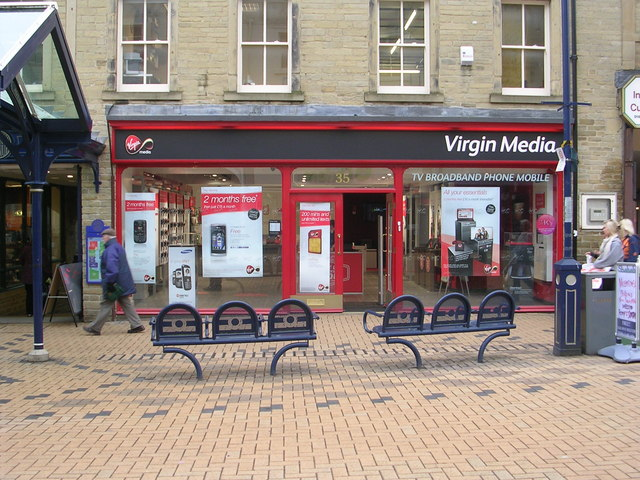
Virgin Media store in Huddersfield, Yorkshire, in 2010

In April 2006, NTL:Telewest announced a £962 million offer to acquire Virgin Mobile UK, which Richard Branson largely accepted via a mix of cash and shares, becoming the largest shareholder with a 10.7% stake. The acquisition was completed in June 2006, creating the UK's first "quadruple play" telecommunications company offering television, internet, landline, and mobile phone services. Following the acquisition of Virgin Mobile, NTL:Telewest secured a 30-year licence from Branson's Virgin Group to use the Virgin brand. Additionally, Virgin Enterprises Limited gained the right to nominate a board director. In February 2007, NTL:Telewest was rebranded as Virgin Media. In 2013, Virgin Media was acquired by John Malone's Liberty Global.

=== Merger of Virgin Media and O2 UK ===
In May 2020, it was reported that Telefónica and Liberty Global were in talks to merge their respective O2 and Virgin Media businesses in the UK. The merger was completed on 1 June 2021, with Liberty Global and Telefónica each holding a 50% stake in Virgin Media O2, the new holding company for the businesses. This represented the largest ever UK telecoms deal, and the biggest UK merger in a decade. The deal made, valued Virgin Media as being worth more than O2, however Liberty Global agreed to pay a £2.5 billion equalisation payment to Telefónica, in part due to Virgin Media's debt level. Recapitalisations, were expected to result in both Liberty Global and Telefónica generating net proceeds from the venture.

=== Post-merger ===
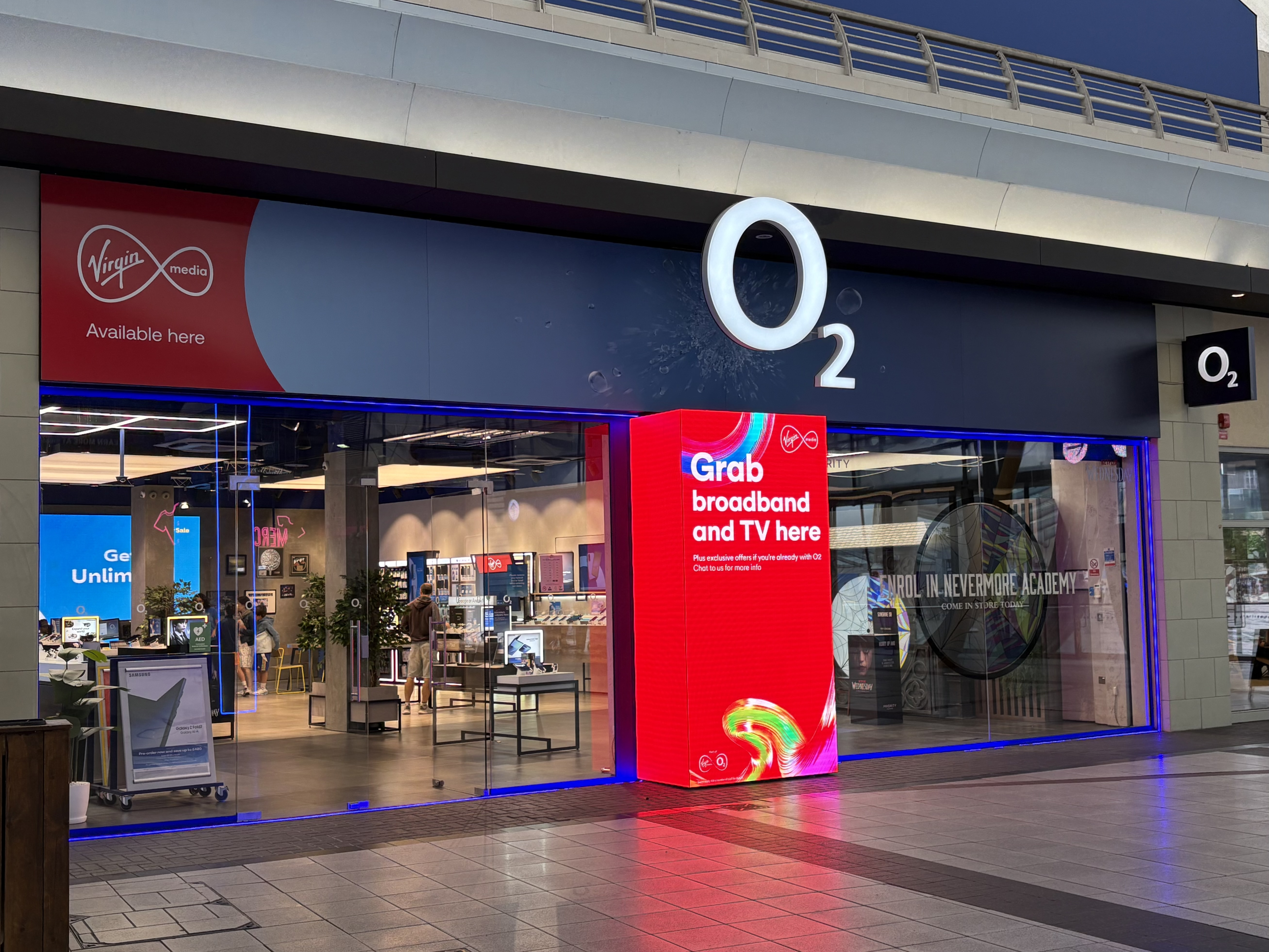
O2 store at The O2, London, with a Virgin Media retail presence

In October 2021, the company introduced a package of complimentary benefits known as 'Volt' for households with Virgin Media broadband who have at least one O2 Pay Monthly plan, applicable to both new and existing customers. These include:

- All eligible O2 Pay Monthly SIMs registered at the household on plans with a data allowance of up to 250GB receive double data. Plans with a data allowance above 250GB are upgraded to Unlimited.
- The O2 Travel Inclusive Zone bolt-on, providing inclusive roaming in 75 international destinations (including the 48 standard Europe Zone destinations, where inclusive data is limited to 25GB of each plan's monthly data allowance) including the United States, Canada, Mexico, Australia, and New Zealand, is added to all eligible O2 Pay Monthly SIMs registered at the household. Calls and texts to and from the UK and country in which the SIM is roaming, and data usage (except in the Europe Zone) are unlimited, subject to fair usage policies.
- The household's Virgin Media broadband is automatically upgraded to the next available speed tier (e.g. 350Mbps to 500Mbps, or 500Mbps to 1Gbps) without downtime or an engineer visit.
- Households can claim up to three Wi-Fi extender pods for areas of the property with a weak Wi-Fi signal, free of charge.

Virgin Media O2 also extended access to O2 Priority in November 2021, providing exclusive perks, ticket presales, and experiences previously exclusive to O2 customers, to Virgin Media customers, allowing them full access to the O2 Priority app.

On 24 July 2023, it was announced that Virgin Media O2 would cut up to 2,000 members of staff by the end of 2023. The figure included 800 job reductions that had already been announced and followed similar headcount reductions made by competitors.

The company announced that it had moved all Virgin Mobile UK customers to the O2 network in August 2023. It had advised customers in January 2023 that they would be transferring, with data allowances either doubling or becoming unlimited. Virgin Mobile no longer offer new plans or services. The following month, Virgin Media O2 acquired the UK-regional broadband business Upp, that provided services in the East of England, with its ownership being sold to Nexfibre, a joint venture owned by Liberty Global, Telefónica and InfraVia Capital Partners. The government had ordered that Upp be sold, on national security grounds.

As part of the companies mobile transformation strategy, a £700m investment was reported in March 2025, aiming to enhance mobile reliability and speed. It was reported that Virgin Media O2 had agreed a deal worth £343 million with Vodafone, in July 2025, to buy spectrum to boost and expand Virgin Media O2 mobile network coverage. The deal would result in Virgin Media O2 having nearly 30% of UK mobile spectrum. Three months later, Virgin Media O2 announced that they would partner with Starlink, to improve UK rural mobile phone coverage. They will be the first mobile operator in the UK to use Starlink satellites. O2 Satellite, an optional payable add-on, will switch to satellite in areas where no signal is available. In December 2025, the company announced it had expanded its 5G standalone footprint in Norfolk, improving connectivity for 940,000 customers at no extra cost, whilst making the network better equipped for future customer led innovations and to embrace technology such as artificial intelligence.

== Corporate affairs ==
The Virgin Media O2 board is led by Chief Executive Lutz Schuler, as of 2025. In September 2025, it was reported that he would take a leave of absence, subsequent to being diagnosed with prostate cancer. When the joint venture was announced, it was reported that it would be led by an eight person board of directors, four each from Liberty Global and Telefónica.

Full year results, showed that in 2024, Virgin Media O2 generated revenue of £10,680.5 million. This was a slight year on year decline, down from £10,912.7 million (full year 2023). The company reports having 45.7 million mobile connections and 5.8 million fixed line customers.

After the merger, it was reported that the advertising spend of Virgin Media and O2 combined would make Virgin Media O2 the fifth largest advertiser in the UK, although the company clarified there would be a reduction in marketing expenditure. Following an advertising pitch, VCCP was retained by Virgin Media O2. A year after the merger, a campaign was launched to promote their Volt proposition.

== Legal issues ==
In November 2025, the Competition Appeal Tribunal (CAT) approved a class action claim in the UK from consumer rights expert Justin Gutmann to take a number of UK mobile operators to trial. The case alleges that some UK mobile phone operators, charged customers for both airtime and device bundles, after the device had been paid for (referred to as a loyalty penalty). Mobile networks, including Virgin Media O2, deny any wrongdoing. Ofcom has worked with mobile network providers to improve this problem, with the lawsuit focusing on historical overcharging. A significant amount of the claim was struck-out, due to how long ago this occurred.
