= NTL Incorporated =

British cable and telecommunications company

Virgin Media Inc.
- Formerly: International CableTel Inc. (1993–1998); NTL Incorporated (1998–2007)
- Type: Public
- Traded as: Nasdaq: ICTL (1993–1998); Nasdaq: NTLI (1998–2000, 2003–2007); NYSE: NLI (2000–2002); Nasdaq: VMED (2007–2013); LSE: VMED (2007–2013)
- Industry: Cable television, cable internet and fixed-line cable telephone services
- Founded: September 27, 1992; 34 years ago
- Defunct: 2013; 13 years ago
- Fate: Acquired by Liberty Global
- Successor: Virgin Media Limited
- Headquarters: New York City, New York, U.S. (corporate); Hook, Hart, England (operational)
- Key people: James Mooney, chairman Stephen Burch, chief executive Jacques Kerrest chief financial officer
- Products: Cable television Broadband; Telephone; Mobile phone
- Revenue: $6.10 billion (2005)
- Number of employees: 22,500 (2005)
- Website: ntl.com at the Wayback Machine (archived 2006-06-13)

NTL Incorporated, branded as ntl:, was an American company founded in 1992, which provided cable television, cable internet and fixed-line cable telephone services in the United Kingdom. While NTL had its headquarters in New York City, the company's operational headquarters were in Hook, Hampshire.

NTL became the dominant cable operator in the United Kingdom, controlling more than 90% of the market. In 2005 residential services generated 78% of NTL's revenue, and business services 22%.

In March 2006, NTL merged with fellow cable telecom company Telewest, and created 'NTL:Telewest', which then also merged with Virgin Mobile UK and Virgin.net in June 2006, creating the UK's first "quadruple play" telecom provider, offering television, internet, landline phone and mobile phone services. In February 2007, NTL:Telewest was rebranded as Virgin Media.

== History ==
=== 1992–2006 ===
Logo as NTL used from 2001 to 2007.

Barclay Knapp and George Blumenthal, the founders of American cellular network company Cellular Communications, Inc. (sold to Airtouch in 1996), established International CableTel in 1993 to take advantage of the deregulation of the UK cable market. Initially, Cabletel acquired local cable franchises covering Guildford and parts of Northern Ireland, Scotland and Wales. In 1996 CableTel acquired National Transcommunications Limited (NTL), the privatised UK Independent Broadcasting Authority transmission-network. In May 1998 CableTel adopted "NTL" as its new name.

The company spent heavily: both on expanding its network and on acquiring rivals (in 1999, it acquired Cambridge Cable, one of the earliest digital networks, that had been installed across the university city ten years earlier). In July 1999, NTL purchased the consumer assets of Cable & Wireless plc for nearly £8.2 billion, integrating the telephone, internet and television operations of Cable & Wireless into its own ever-expanding operation.

Devalued and struggling with debts of around $18bn, NTL had to seek Chapter 11 bankruptcy-protection in May 2002 in order to organise a refinancing deal. The company did not emerge from protection until January 2003, having converted around $11bn of debt into shares – technically, this amounted to the largest debt default in US corporate history. The company reduced its debt to $6.4bn. A re-organisation split NTL itself into NTL Inc. (covering the UK and Irish markets) and NTL Europe Inc. (for the French, Swiss and German parts of the corporation). New executives replaced the NTL president, CEO and co-founder Barclay Knapp, as well as Stephen Carter, the MD and COO.

After exiting from Chapter 11 protection, NTL produced an operating profit. In 2004, it announced plans to split the broadcasting division off from the main company. In December 2004, NTL sold its broadcast-unit to a consortium led by Macquarie Communications Infrastructure Group (MCG) for £1.27 billion. Macquarie renamed the division Arqiva in May 2005. This sale allowed NTL to focus on its "core businesses" of providing communications packages and cable services.

In late 2004, NTL purchased the remaining shares of the Internet service provider (ISP) virgin.net, originally a joint venture between NTL and Richard Branson's Virgin Group.

By 2005, its UK network consisted of a 7,800 km fibre backbone with the potential to reach 8.4 million residential homes and around 610,000 businesses. In January of that year, NTL started rolling out video on demand. With content selected by NTL, this service covered genres including music videos, children's programming and adult entertainment, as an extension to the basic 'pay per view' services the company offered for film and sport content. The new service allowed customers to rewind, fast forward and pause content.

Despite NTL Ireland turning a profit, in May 2005, NTL sold their Dublin, Galway, and Waterford cable business (which they had acquired in 1999 for €825 million from the Irish government) to UGC Europe for €325 million – this after having spent in excess of €100 million on network infrastructure, resulting in a loss of €500 million, more than 50% of the purchase price. Liberty Global continued to use the NTL brand in Ireland, but was eventually merged with Chorus Communications and rebranded as UPC Ireland in May 2010.

By July 2005, NTL had cut its debt to £1.445 billion with an operating cashflow of £178 million. The company had 3.2 million customers buying at least one service from them, with the 1.4 million subscribers to broadband services making NTL the market leader in this field.

=== NTL/Telewest merger ===
From late 2003 discussions commenced on a merger between Telewest and NTL. Thanks to their geographically different areas, NTL and Telewest had co-operated previously, as in re-directing potential customers living outside their respective areas. On 3 October 2005, NTL announced a USD$6 billion purchase of Telewest, forming one of the largest media companies in the UK. The merger agreement as structured would have left NTL having to negotiate with BBC Worldwide, the BBC's commercial arm, due to a change-of-ownership clause written into the agreement for UKTV, a joint venture with Telewest's Flextech content division. To prevent this, Telewest instead acquired NTL.

The parties completed the merger on 3 March 2006, making the merged company the UK's largest cable-provider, with more than 90% of the market. Once merged, the combined company renamed itself to ntl:Telewest, with ex-NTL shareholders controlling 75% of the stock and ex-Telewest shareholders 25%. Nine of the eleven directors of the new board came from NTL and two from Telewest.

=== Virgin Mobile merger ===
In December 2005 NTL and Virgin Mobile announced that talks had taken place regarding a merger.

Virgin Mobile's independent directors rejected the original bid of £817 million ($1.4 billion), taking the view that NTL's bid "undervalued the business". Sir Richard Branson reportedly expressed confidence that a re-structured deal could go ahead, and in January 2006 NTL increased its offer to £961m (372p per share). On 4 April 2006, NTL Incorporated announced a £962.4m recommended offer for Virgin Mobile. According to reports, Branson accepted a mix of shares and cash, making him a 10.7% shareholder of the combined company.

The takeover, which was completed on 4 July 2006, created the UK's first 'quadruple play' media company, bringing together television, Internet broadband, mobile-phone and fixed-line phone services. The deal included a 30-year exclusive branding agreement that saw NTL adopt the Virgin name across its consumer operations as it merged operations with its current Telewest brand. As a result, on 8 November 2006, NTL announced it would change its name to Virgin Media plc.

=== Proposed ITV merger ===
In November 2006, NTL announced that it had approached commercial television broadcaster ITV about a proposed merger. BSkyB effectively blocked the merger on 12 November 2006, when it controversially bought a 17.9% stake in ITV plc, a move that attracted anger from NTL shareholder Richard Branson and an investigation from media and telecoms regulator Ofcom. On 6 December 2006, NTL announced that it had complained to the Office of Fair Trading about BSkyB's move, and that it would withdraw its attempt to buy ITV plc, stating that it did not believe that it could currently make a deal on favourable terms.

== Services ==
=== Internet ===
NTL offered broadband Internet access connections through cable. The service operated through SACMs (Stand-alone cable modems) and set-top boxes (STBs).

In NTL areas customers could also access a 512 kbit/s download-speed; and both NTL and Telewest offered dial-up Internet services on a pay-as-you-go basis, or at a fixed monthly fee of £14.99 for unlimited usage.

The broadband services did not have a bandwidth-cap or a fair-usage policy; this meant that customers had unlimited usage and need pay no extra charges related to the amount of data downloaded. However NTL has admitted introducing traffic shaping.

NTL started trialling 20 Mbit/s, and temporarily upgraded some 10 Mbit/s subscribers to this speed in October 2006. Furthermore, NTL started conducting trials of a 100 Mbit broadband service on its cable network.

After trials in the Guildford area from mid-1999, NTL launched its original broadband services at the same time that NTL acquired the Cable business of Cable and Wireless (early 2000). In the "original NTL" (also known as "Langley") areas, NTL has always supplied broadband services via DOCSIS cable-modems. In these areas the digital television set-top boxes used an incompatible standard, DAVIC.

Initially, NTL decided to terminate service to approximately 90,000 ex-Cable and Wireless subscribers on short notice. This threatened to leave customers stranded and without access to their email or websites and was due to NTL's lack of infrastructure capability in some areas. Before termination of services, Boltblue struck a deal with NTL and Cable and Wireless Communications to save 90,000 and later an additional 210,000 customers. The roll-out of broadband services in the ex-Cable and Wireless franchises started in mid 2001.

NTL provided ex-Cable and Wireless subscribers with broadband through the set-top box (STB) also used for digital television services, adopting the rationale that subscribers could self-install. Initially, NTL supplied a "Self Install Kit" consisting of connecting cable, adapters and an install CD. Following demonstrated problems, NTL gradually introduced cable modems and phased out the self-install approach. The Pace STBs proved highly problematic, exhibiting two major flaws.

Firstly, large numbers of connections (for example, those with peer-to-peer (P2P) software) would cause the connection to slow down and eventually freeze the modem part of the STB (also required for interactive TV services, which suffered a similar effect when downloading). Customers in these circumstances had to re-boot the STB.

Secondly, the single processor and sharing the internal modem between television and broadband services made the television part of the box slow and unresponsive, for example making it extremely difficult to change channel using the remote. This became particularly evident when using the lower "Tiers of Service" such the 128 kbit/s downstream 64 kbit/s upstream, as the digital television set-top box without broadband service actually enjoyed a 256 kbit/s upstream.

Although capable of higher speeds (up to 4 Mbit/s), NTL did not make speeds higher than 1 Mbit/s available due to degradation of the DTV service.

NTL eventually replaced the Pace set-top boxes with Samsung models that used a dual-processor architecture, overcoming the shortcomings of the Pace, and capable of much better downstream performance. However, with the advent of higher "Tiers of Service" of 10 Mbit/s downstream and higher, plus the reducing cost of NTL's cable modems (supplied by Ambit Broadband) NTL now supplies all subscribers with cable modems.

The NTL network runs through transparent proxy servers. Up to 15 server addresses host each area. These transparent proxy servers also override the user's hosts file and prevent manual DNS updates. This makes it easier for NTL to provide a more reliable connection as well as being able to monitor traffic requirements in each area. This also causes many problems for websites which record IP addresses to ban and/or track users. This means that if a website bans one offender, it bans everyone in the same area. Also, many on-line games automatically ban IP addresses with multiple usernames associated with them. Small-scale games do not cause too many problems, but when friends attempt to spread the game around, the system prevents everyone (including the original player) from using the game. On the other hand, advanced users can easily create a large number of illegitimate accounts on the aforementioned websites, allowing one user both to prevent all other users on the NTL network using the game, as well as to become untraceable.

NTL has used MAC addresses to track and register customers to the NTL internet service. As NTL had not supported the use of routers, or Xbox on the minority Set Top Box based Broadband Internet service, users had to use a clone MAC address feature to connect to the Internet when using an STB. This has become a common problem for people wishing to connect their Xbox to the existing internet connection through a router or PC connected to their STB, if they fail to use the official registration process. (These comments do not apply to the majority (>90%) use of cable modems).

=== Television ===
The digital television service, which launched in 2000, offered a number of products including true video on demand, a PVR, and HDTV. On 1 September 2006, NTL introduced the FreeTV digital package to its telephone subscribers free of charge. However, value-pack customers lost their value-pack discounts if they integrated the FreeTV deal into their existing packages.

==== PVR and high definition services ====
NTL launched TV Drive, its high-definition television (HDTV) and personal video recorder (PVR) service in Glasgow and Teesside on 16 November 2006. The service relied on the service of the same name offered in NTL's Telewest areas, and used a new PVR set-top-box, with three tuners and a 160GB hard disk for up to 80 hours' recording. The presence of three tuners meant that the TV Drive could record two channels at the same time while the user was watching a third.

==== Video on demand ====
NTL started to roll out its Video on Demand (VoD) service branded "NTL On Demand", using the Teleport system on Telewest's network. In contrast to Sky which, due to technical limitations, could only provide near-VOD services, NTL On Demand provided a true VoD system. The service allowed customers of NTL digital television to download programmes as and when they wanted to watch them from servers at the customer's local head-end. As the broadcaster automatically stored content on NTL's servers, it removed the need to pre-record many programmes. Users could search through a large library of programmes and watch them when they wanted to as part of their subscription. This library included a free 7-day watch-again feature for TV programmes produced by the BBC, Channel 4 and Flextech. NTL also offered other television shows, films (service branded FilmFlex), and music videos, mostly for an additional fee. The VoD service also provided HD content that would work in conjunction with the TV Drive PVR.

==== Fixed-line telephone ====
NTL also provided telephone services to its customers, as the second-largest fixed-line telephony provider in the UK, behind BT, who until 1984 held the monopoly on fixed-line telephony services in the UK. In 2003, revenue from mobile lines became greater than the fixed-line telephone revenue.

==== Premium TV ====
Premium TV was a subsidiary of NTL. It purchased stakes in Rangers F.C., Celtic F.C., Aston Villa F.C., Middlesbrough F.C., Newcastle United F.C. and Leicester City F.C. The investments included interest free loans to the clubs to act as their exclusive agent for the sale of media sponsorship, advertising and publishing rights across all media platforms, including ownership of the clubs live television and radio rights.

Premium TV operated and fully funded Boro TV for Middlesbrough F.C. from February 1998. Boro TV Extra was added in August 2001, taking advantage of the relaxation in the TV rights regulations. Both channels were closed in July 2005 after NTL withdrew funding.

In March 2000, news broke that NTL would spend more than £200 million ($316 million at the time) for a decade-long deal to own exclusive worldwide television and internet streaming rights to the events at the "Super 12" group of horseracing courses. This involved deals with BBC, Channel 4, and NTL's own Premium TV networks.

On 14 June 2000, NTL won the rights to show 40 live Premier League matches on a pay-per-view basis for three years, beginning at the start of the 2001–02 season. NTL would pay approximately £109 million per annum for the rights. NTL pulled out of the deal on 18 October 2000, claiming that it was "unable to agree final terms". The failure to complete the deal, led to a lack of confidence in their proposed 2005 joint bid with ITV plc.

On 19 June 2000, NTL entered into a joint venture with The Football League to set up an internet portal for all 72 clubs. Under the terms of the deal, NTL would pay rights fees of up to £65 million over five years, with all participating clubs sharing in the profits of the joint venture, with a variable term in the region of 20 years. Premium TV was eventually able to set up 78 football club websites after adding its partially owned clubs. The deal had with The Football League had to be renegotiated in September 2002 after NTL could no longer afford to pay its instalments. The League clubs would now receive £5m and an 80-per-cent share of all future revenue earned by the venture until the total amount reaches the original figure of £35m.

NTL, through Premium TV, launched the ITN News Channel, a joint venture with ITN, on 1 August 2000. In June 2002, Carlton Television and Granada Television – the predecessors of ITV plc – bought out ITN's 65-per-cent stake. This led to a rebrand as the ITV News Channel in September 2002. In April 2004 the newly created ITV plc bought NTL's remaining 35-per-cent stake to assume full control of the channel.

Premium TV also oversaw NTL's 49-per-cent share in pay-per-view movie service Front Row, in joint venture with Telewest and NTL's 48.1-per-cent stake in interactive television technology and games firm, Two Way TV.

Premium TV also operated Lions TV between June and August 2001, covering 2001 British & Irish Lions tour to Australia. The channel showcased eight, one hour 'behind the scenes' programmes to be made by Premium TV.

Premium TV also provided the funds to create programming specifically for the UK feed (British Eurosport) of the pan-European channel Eurosport. It did not have a stake in the sports channel, but got a share of revenue.

Premium TV planned to launch a live sports channel in September 2001 called British Sport, which would have combined archive footage from the BBC with live coverage of rugby union, basketball and ice hockey. Premium TV dropped its plans after realising it could not compete with other sports broadcasters, such as ITV and BSkyB. Instead Premium TV chose to launch a channel with the working title of Classic Sport, offering classic BBC sports footage from the Grandstand archives, the channel never materialised. The Ice Hockey Superleague issued a high court writ claiming damages of up to £10m from the company, after its £1m-a-year TV deal was cancelled at short notice. The Superleague settled out of court for an undisclosed sum.

Premium TV was spun-out of NTL's UK cable operations and into NTL Europe Inc. in 2002, as part of a rescue plan devised by Barclay Knapp. Premium TV was placed under the control of the crisis and turnaround advisory group, Quest Turnaround Advisors. Quest negotiated commercial contracts with joint venture partners to eliminate £43 million of parent company guarantees and generated $10 million cash through restructuring. At the same time, Quest doubled paid subscribers to 75,000, cut staff by 50-per-cent, and broke even within 15 months of taking control. The business was then sold for $54 million to Access Industries, who merged it with Inform Group in 2007 to create Perform.

== Broadcasting ==
In February 2001, NTL and Vivendi Universal launched The Studio, a 50:50 joint venture film channel which was carried by cable networks in the UK and Ireland. It closed in January 2003.
