= Virgin Media =

British television and telecommunications company

Virgin Media Limited
- Type: Subsidiary
- Industry: Telecommunications; Mass media
- Predecessors: NTL; Telewest; Virgin Mobile UK
- Founded: 8 February 2007; 19 years ago
- Headquarters: Reading, Berkshire, England, UK
- Area served: United Kingdom
- Key people: John C. Malone (chairman); Lutz Schüler (CEO)
- Products: Digital television; broadband internet; fixed-line telephone
- Revenue: ▼£10.685billion (2024)
- Operating income: ▲£0.928 billion (2024)
- Net income: ▼ -£16.5 million (2024)
- Total assets: ▲£13.166 billion (2024)
- Number of employees: ▲15,932 (2024)
- Parent: Virgin Media O2
- Subsidiaries: Virgin Media Business
- Website: www.virginmedia.com

Virgin Media Limited is a British telecommunications company which provides telephone, television and internet services in the United Kingdom. Its headquarters are at Green Park in Reading, Berkshire, England. It is owned by Virgin Media O2, a 50:50 joint venture between Liberty Global and Telefónica. Since its foundation in 2007, the company has used the Virgin branding under license from Richard Branson.

Virgin Media owns and operates its own hybrid fibre-coaxial and fibre to the premises (FTTP) networks. Although most of the network is urban, Nexfibre (a 50:50 joint venture between Virgin Media O2 and Infravia Capital Partners) is expanding the network to more areas. As of year end 2024, it had a total of approximately 5.8 million customers. Since the acquisition of Smallworld Cable in 2014, Virgin Media is the main cable provider in the UK, with connections available to over 18.4 million homes in 2024. Virgin Media is one of the "big four" internet service providers in the UK along with BT (EE), Sky and TalkTalk. In the past, Virgin Media also operated a mobile virtual network operator (Virgin Mobile) and operated TV channels and produced television content (Virgin Media Television).

== History ==
=== Origins ===
The company's origins lie in both Telewest and NTL, which merged in March 2006.

Telewest began in 1984 in Croydon under the name "Croydon Cable", and was acquired by United Cable of Denver in 1988. The company expanded during the 1990s and adopted the Telewest name in 1992 following the merger of its then-parent TCI and US West. It expanded into cable television access in 1999 by purchasing the remaining 50% stake in Cable London, one of the first cable TV companies in the UK, from NTL, adding 400,000 homes in north London. In April 2000 Telewest merged with Flextech, and in November extended its cable network with the acquisition of Eurobell, taking the total number of homes past 4.9 million.

NTL was established by Barclay Knapp and George Blumenthal in 1993 as "International CableTel", taking advantage of the deregulation of the UK cable market. Initially, Cabletel acquired local cable franchises covering Guildford, Northern Ireland and parts of Central Scotland and South Wales. In 1996, CableTel acquired National Transcommunications Limited (NTL), the privatised UK Independent Broadcasting Authority transmission network. In 1998 CableTel adopted "NTL" as its new name.

NTL purchased the ISP Virgin.net in 2004, having originally operated it as a joint venture with Virgin Group since it launched in November 1996. It sold ADSL broadband services through BT landlines to those living outside areas served by NTL's cable network and also offered subscription-based and subscription-free dial-up Internet access. Prior to acquiring Virgin.net, NTL offered a similar package called NTL Freedom.

=== Merger and Virgin Mobile acquisition ===
Telewest and NTL began discussions about a merger in late 2003. Thanks to their geographically distinct areas, NTL and Telewest had co-operated previously, as in redirecting potential customers living outside their respective areas. On 3 October 2005, NTL announced a US$16 billion purchase of Telewest, to form one of the largest media companies in the UK. The merger agreement as structured would have required NTL to negotiate with BBC Worldwide (the BBC's commercial arm) due to a change-of-ownership clause written into the agreement for UKTV, a joint venture with Telewest's Flextech content division. To prevent this, Telewest instead acquired NTL.

In December 2005 NTL:Telewest and mobile virtual network operator (MVNO) Virgin Mobile UK announced that talks had taken place regarding a merger. Virgin Mobile's independent directors rejected the original bid of £817 million ($1.4 billion), taking the view that NTL's bid "undervalued the business". Sir Richard Branson reportedly expressed confidence that a restructured deal could go ahead, and in January 2006 NTL increased its offer to £961 million (372p per share). On 4 April 2006, NTL announced a £962.4 million recommended offer for Virgin Mobile. According to reports, Branson accepted a mix of shares and cash, making him a 10.7% shareholder of the combined company.

NTL and Telewest formally completed their merger on 3 March 2006, making the merged company the UK's largest cable provider, with more than 90% of the market. The combined company renamed itself NTL Incorporated, with ex-NTL shareholders controlling 75% of the stock and ex-Telewest shareholders 25%. Nine of the 11 directors of the new board came from NTL, with two from Telewest.

NTL:Telewest's takeover of Virgin Mobile completed on 4 July 2006, creating the UK's first 'quadruple play' media company, offering television, internet, mobile phone and fixed-line telephone services. The deal included a 30-year exclusive branding agreement that saw NTL adopt the "Virgin" name after it completed its merger with Telewest. NTL:Telewest announced on 8 November 2006 it would change its name to "Virgin Media Inc".

On 9 November 2006, NTL announced it had approached the commercial television broadcaster ITV plc about a proposed merger, after a similar announcement by ITV. BSkyB effectively blocked the merger on 17 November 2006 by controversially buying a 17.9% stake in ITV plc, a move that attracted anger from NTL shareholder Richard Branson, and an investigation from media and telecoms regulator Ofcom. On 6 December 2006 NTL announced that it had complained to the Office of Fair Trading about BSkyB's move, and would withdraw its attempt to buy ITV plc, stating it did not believe it could make a deal on favourable terms.

=== Rebrand as Virgin Media ===
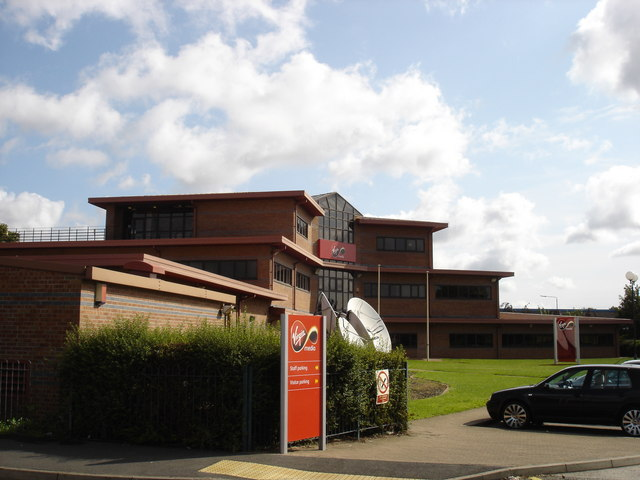
Virgin Media's offices in Nottingham

In November 2006, the company signed a deal with Sir Richard Branson to license the Virgin brand for the combined business. NTL Group's services – previously marketed under the NTL, Telewest and Virgin.net brands – were merged with Virgin Mobile under the Virgin Media brand on 8 February 2007. Virgin.net was integrated into the new brand as Virgin Media Beyond Cable (later Virgin Media National).

In February 2007, Virgin Central, an on-demand service, gained the rights to begin showing episodes of the television show Lost (already shown on Sky 1), and other shows including Alias and The OC. This service extended the on-demand service previously known as Teleport TV; it was later renamed TV Choice, offering recently broadcast shows and other shows and series.

=== Dispute with Sky ===
A channel agreement for Virgin Media to keep non-premium Sky channels ended on 1 March 2007. As this date approached, Sky ran an advertising campaign promoting popular shows Virgin Media customers would lose and urged impacted customers to contact Virgin Media to get them to return to the negotiating table or switch to Sky. Virgin Media responded via a press campaign, that included a letter signed by Richard Branson and chief executive Steve Burch, with the headline "Sky don't want you to see the whole picture (strange for a TV company)".

The companies failed to resolve their differences, and subsequently Virgin Media replaced the Sky1, Sky2, Sky Travel, Sky Travel Extra, Sky Sports News and Sky News channel content, so these could no longer be viewed by their customers. Sky said the deal would have cost Virgin Media 3p per customer per day (roughly £35m per year), but Virgin Media said that a minimum payment guarantee in the contract meant that the amount due would be more than twice that figure. Sky attributed part of the rate rise to the new deal including Sky3, Sky Arts and undisclosed high definition and video on demand content. The name for the removed Sky News channel was initially changed to "Sky Snooze try BBC", however on 2nd March 2007, Richard Branson requested that to be removed.

Threatened legal action

On 2 March 2007, the National Consumer Council accused Sky and Virgin of "behaving like children" and stated that it would consider whether or not to raise a super-complaint against them "that will help to knock heads together" by the end of that month. On 5 March 2007, Virgin Media threatened to take legal action against BSkyB if the matter remained unresolved in 30 days. On 12 April 2007, Virgin Media filed a legal case in the High Court against BSkyB under the UK Competition Act 1998 and Article 82 of the EC Treaty. Sky claimed that Virgin Media made little effort to arbitrate. On 9 May 2008, it was reported that Virgin Media and Sky had held talks to resolve the dispute.

Resolution

On 4 November 2008, it was announced that an agreement had been struck for Sky's Basic channels – including Sky1, Sky2, Sky3, Sky News, Sky Sports News, Sky Arts 1, Sky Arts 2, Sky Real Lives and Sky Real Lives 2 – to return to Virgin Media from 13 November 2008 until 12 June 2011. In exchange, Sky would provide continued carriage of Virgin Media Television's channels – Living, Livingit, Bravo, Bravo +1, Challenge, Challenge Jackpot and Virgin1 – for the same period. The agreements included fixed annual carriage fees of £30 million for the channels, with both suppliers able to secure additional capped payments if their channels met performance-related targets. As part of the agreements, Sky and Virgin Media agreed to end all legal proceedings against each other relating to the carriage of their respective basic channels. In August 2009, the Advertising Standards Authority upheld claims made by Virgin Media in its marketing, in response to a complaint from Sky.

=== Liberty Global ownership ===
Until 2013, the company was listed on the U.S.-based NASDAQ Stock Market and the London Stock Exchange. On 5 February 2013, Liberty Global announced that they had agreed to buy Virgin Media for approximately US$23.3 billion (£15 billion) in a stock and cash merger. On 15 April, EU regulatory approval for the deal was granted, the final hurdle in the acquisition. On 4 June, shareholders approved the acquisition and the deal was completed on 7 June.

On 3 February 2014, Virgin Media acquired Smallworld Fibre, a cable provider based in North West England and Western Scotland, for an undisclosed fee. Smallworld's network was merged into Virgin Media's during 2014.

In November 2014, Virgin Media reached an agreement to sell its ADSL business to TalkTalk Group, allowing Virgin to focus on its cable broadband offering. Virgin began transferring customers to TalkTalk in February 2015.

On 20 July 2018, it was announced that Virgin Media would stop broadcasting all of the UKTV channels from 22 July 2018 over fees and an issue with Virgin's on-demand broadcasting rights. The companies were not able to agree terms to allow the ten channels and their +1 and HD offshoots to continue to be available on the platform and the channels stopped being available at just after midnight on 22 July 2018 with Virgin replacing the UKTV channels on their service with other networks. This led to a backlash by customers with some threatening to leave. The dispute finally ended after three weeks on 11 August 2018 after Virgin Media and UKTV reached an agreement. Virgin Media gradually restored all 10 UKTV channels with their +1 and HD Simulcast channels along with simulcast GOLD HD and the reinstalled UKTV Play app. The app then featured five times the amount of on-demand content. UKTV Channels and the UKTV app were restored to Virgin Media platforms by 15 August 2018.

=== Merger with O2 ===
On 7 May 2020, Liberty Global reached an agreement with Telefónica to merge their UK businesses, Virgin Media and O2, in a deal worth £31bn, subject to regulatory approval by the Competition and Markets Authority. The CMA approved the merger on 19 May 2021, and the merger was completed on 1 June 2021. This created one of the UK's largest entertainment and telecommunications companies, to rival BT Group. The resulting company is called VMED O2 UK Limited, operating as Virgin Media O2.

== Products ==
=== Virgin Broadband ===
The broadband division combined NTL's cable-broadband operations (broadband Internet access connections through cable), Blueyonder (Telewest's cable-broadband operations) and Virgin.net (ADSL, broadband Internet access through a non-cable telephone line). Virgin Broadband in cabled areas is marketed as "fibre optic broadband". It included a Hybrid fibre-coaxial network, where fibre optic trunk lines are used to connect the area's headend to cabinets on the street.

In July 2009 and 2010, Virgin Media Broadband came first in an Ofcom broadband speed test in the UK. Ofcom tested typical speeds provided by most ISPs in the UK, including BSkyB, BT, Tiscali, AOL, TalkTalk, Plusnet, O2 and Orange. Since most broadband connections in the UK are provided by ADSL, and the quality of phone lines varies according to distance from exchange, most landline broadband services are marketed as being the maximum speed that the individual's phone line will support, "up to 8 mb". As a result, actual speeds obtained vary greatly. Cable broadband has no such speed variability, as the network is fully owned and controlled by the cable company providing the broadband – any slowdowns are wholly as a result of traffic shaping, or local capacity. For this reason, the results showed that Virgin Media's broadband speed was closer to (although still not 100% of) the "up to" figures it advertised, compared to other providers. While landline broadband providers offered rates of "up to" 24 Mbit/s, the launch of a Virgin's 50 Mbit/s service on 15 December 2008 was advertised as "the UK's Fastest Broadband."

On 8 October 2009, Virgin Media began trials to deliver its TV and broadband services at up to 50 Mbit/s downstream via a VDSL2 line to a roadside cabinet. The cabinets were linked to Virgin Media backhaul via new fibre laid by Vtesse Networks through BT's local exchange, 5 km away. As well as broadband, Virgin Media offered its full range of TV services, including high definition and on demand, over the new infrastructure.

On 11 March 2010, Virgin Media announced a six-month trial using telephone poles to deliver 50 Mbit/s broadband and TV services to the Berkshire village of Woolhampton. Virgin Media identified more than one million homes in parts of the UK that could benefit from deployment over telephone poles, without the need for government subsidy. During July the trial was extended to existing commercial infrastructure in the Welsh village of Crumlin, Caerphilly.

On 7 October 2010, Ofcom ordered BT to open up its fibre-optic network to competing broadband providers to help drive forward the rollout of high-speed internet services in the UK. Ofcom also ordered BT to free up access to network infrastructure – including all telephone poles and underground ducts – for the rollout of broadband to areas BT does not plan to reach. Virgin Media confirmed plans to expand its broadband network in the UK by using the infrastructure owned by BT.

On 27 October 2010, Virgin Media announced its 100 Mbit/s downstream broadband service, featuring 10 Mbit/s upstream rates, which went on sale on 8 December 2010. Early service areas were parts of London, the South East and Yorkshire. With the faster upstream rates specifically, it expects the uptake in cloud computing services will also see an increase. The roll-out was expected to be complete by mid-2012.

On 11 January 2012, Virgin Media announced plans to double the speeds of selected broadband packages; its 10 Mbit/s package increased to 20 Mbit/s, 20 Mbit/s and 30Mbit/s to 60 Mbit/s, 50 Mbit/s to 100 Mbit/s, and its 100 Mbit/s package to 120 Mbit/s. The roll-out is expected to begin in February 2012 and be completed by mid-2013, at a cost of £110m. Since the announcement, Virgin Media has confirmed that it now plans to also upgrade 50 Mbit/s customers to 120 Mbit/s at no extra cost, in effect cutting the monthly fee for existing 100 Mbit/s customers.

On 11 November 2013, Virgin Media announced its 152 Mbit/s downstream broadband service, featuring 12 Mbit/s upstream rates, which started rolling out to customers from 28 February 2014. The company also upgraded existing customers, from 30 Mbit/s to 50 Mbit/s, 60 Mbit/s to 100 Mbit/s, and 120 Mbit/s to the new 152 Mbit/s service.

In February 2015, Virgin Media announced its biggest investment in broadband infrastructure in over a decade, a £3bn investment to improve its fibre optic broadband network, increasing the network's reach from 13 million to 17 million homes.

On 29 September 2015, Virgin Media announced its broadband packages would be rebranded as Vivid. The company upgraded existing customers from 50 Mbit/s to 70 Mbit/s, 100 Mbit/s to 150 Mbit/s and 152 Mbit/s to 200 Mbit/s. The speed upgrade was rolled out to 90% of customers by the end of 2015.

On 22 March 2017, Virgin Media made ultrafast speeds standard with new bundles. 100 Mbit/s entry level rising to top speed of 300 Mbit/s. On 29 April 2019, Virgin Media unveiled a new bundle with a download speed of 500 Mbit/s.

On 30 September 2019, Virgin Media announced their new Gig1 rollout, providing download speeds up to 1,140 Mbit/s (over 1 Gbit/s) and upload speeds up to 52 Mbit/s, starting in Southampton, which has subsequently rolled out to selected major cities and their surrounding areas including Manchester, Leeds, Edinburgh and Glasgow. They aimed to roll this out across the entire Virgin Media network by the end of 2021.

On 29 June 2020, Virgin Media announced that customers on their "Ultimate Oomph" broadband, TV and phone package would receive a free speed boost from their M500 package to their new M600 package, replacing 516 Mbit/s download and 36 Mbit/s upload with 636 Mbit/s download and 41 Mbit/s upload. The free upgrades were completed for all customers by 31 March 2021. M600 is only available through the Ultimate Oomph package bundle.

Advertised Broadband Packages (Mbit/s)
Name	Average download speed	Min. guaranteed download speed	Average upload speed
M50	54	27	5
M125	132	66	20
M250	264	132	25
M350	362	181	36
M500	516	258	52
M600	636	315	41
Gig1 Fibre	1130	565	104

==== Bandwidth throttling ====
Virgin Media maintain on their consumer website that they do not throttle users' download or upload bandwidth. In 2013, Virgin Media changed their traffic management policy. The policy stated a maximum throttling amount of 40% on most services, however users reported being throttled by as much as 54%. Virgin Media's advertisements regarding their "unlimited" broadband services, and their controversial traffic management were investigated by the Advertising Standards Authority, after having previous advertisements banned.

From 28 February 2014, Virgin Media announced that they were scrapping traffic management for downstream traffic on 30 Mbit/s or higher packages. As a result of this, 30 Mbit/s or higher packages were only throttled on the upstream, where as 20 Mbit/s or below packages were throttled on both the upstream and the downstream. Sometime after this Virgin Media changed their policy again stating on their website that no matter what broadband package users have taken, they will not be subject to any bandwidth throttling.

==== London Underground ====
In March 2012, Virgin Media won an exclusive contract to provide Wi-Fi access to London Underground platforms until 2017. The company announced mobile internet at 80 stations by July 2012 and a further 40 stations by the end of 2012. The service, which gave access to mobile internet via a TfL portal offering travel, news and entertainment bulletins, remained free for Virgin Media customers, along with customers of partnered companies, such as Vodafone and EE, after the 2012 Summer Olympics. Other users were only be able to access a limited amount of free content on the TfL portal, with full mobile internet services offered on a pay-as-you-go basis.

=== Virgin Media Business ===
On 11 February 2010, ntl:Telewest Business was rebranded as Virgin Media Business, marking the end of the NTL and Telewest brand being used by the company. The company provides dedicated internet and telecommunications services to businesses.

=== Virgin Phone ===
Virgin Phone offers landline telephone services; it ranks as the number two service behind the former UK state monopoly, BT Group.

On 1 April 2010, Virgin Media began to offer free home phone to mobile calls. Virgin Phone customers are able to call Virgin Mobile customers at no charge, within the Talk Plan specified periods.

=== Virgin TV ===
Virgin TV, the digital cable television service from Virgin Media, ranked as the UK's second largest pay TV service, having 3.6m subscribers, compared to BSkyB's 8.2m in Q3 2007. 55% of UK households potentially had access to Virgin's network in 2007. Virgin TV ranked as the UK's largest provider of on-demand content, with over 3 million Video on Demand (VoD) customers as of October 2011 with over 6,500 hours of programming.

== Former operations ==
=== Virgin Mobile (1999–2023) ===
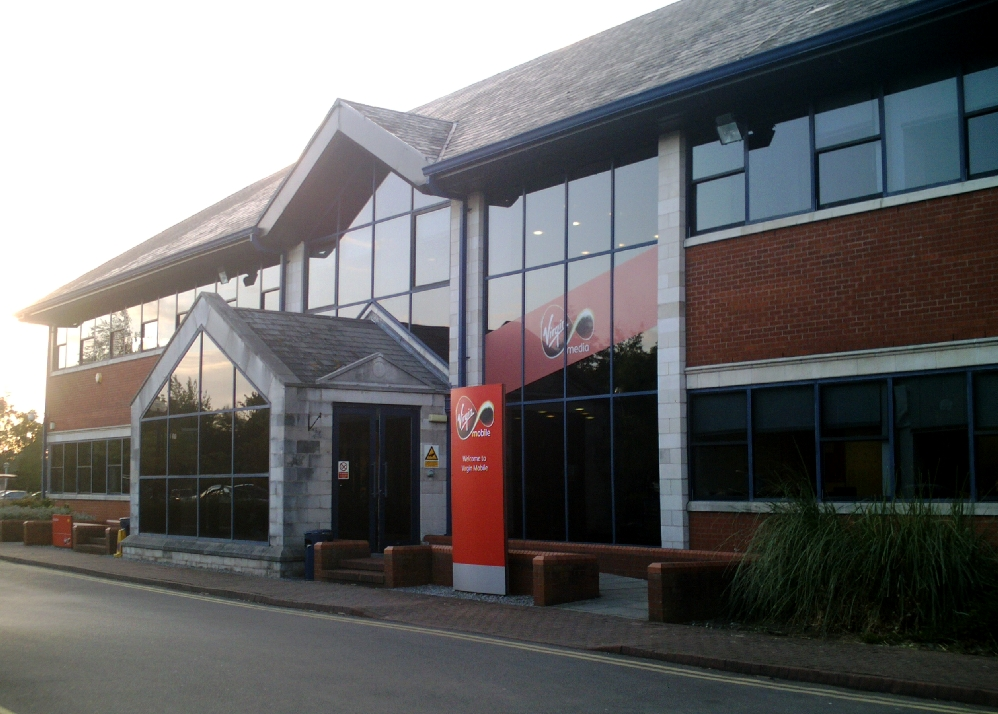
The former headquarters of Virgin Mobile in Trowbridge, Wiltshire.

Virgin Media ran Virgin Mobile Telecoms Limited, a UK-based Mobile Virtual Network Operator (MVNO) from November 1999 using the one2one (later T-Mobile and EE) network. After the merger between Virgin Media and Telefónica it was announced that Virgin Mobile would close and customers would be moved to the O2 network. This was completed in August 2023 and Virgin Mobile ceased operations on 31 August 2023.

=== Virgin Media Television ===
Virgin Media Television (formerly Flextech) was the content subsidiary of Virgin Media, and operated a number of wholly owned channels including Bravo, LIVING, Trouble and Challenge. It launched Virgin1 on Freeview and cable on 1 October 2007, replacing Ftn on Freeview.

On 4 June 2010, Virgin Media announced that they had reached an agreement to sell Virgin Media Television to BSkyB, subject to regulatory approval. The acquisition expanded Sky's portfolio of basic pay TV channels and eliminated the carriage fees it previously paid for distributing VMtv channels on its TV services. The companies reached a number of agreements providing for the carriage of certain Sky standard and high-definition (HD) channels, including securing new carriage agreements for wholesale distribution of Sky's basic channel line-up, including Sky 1 and Sky Arts, and the newly acquired VMtv channels, on Virgin Media's cable TV service.

On 29 June 2010, the Irish Competition Authority cleared the proposed transaction. BSkyB and Virgin Media announced the completion of the acquisition on 13 July 2010, following Irish regulatory approval. VMtv was renamed the Living TV Group. Sky paid Virgin Media an initial £105 million for the acquisition, with up to an additional £55 million to be paid upon UK regulatory clearance.

On 20 July 2010, the Office of Fair Trading (OFT) announced they would review BSkyB's acquisition of Virgin Media Television to judge whether it posed any competition concerns in the UK. On 14 September 2010, the OFT decided not to refer BSkyB's takeover of Virgin Media's TV channels to the Competition Commission. Virgin1 was also a part of the deal but was rebranded as Channel One on 3 September 2010, as the Virgin name was not licensed to Sky. The new carriage deals were for up to nine years. Previously the carriage deals tended to be struck every three years.

=== Sit-up ===
Virgin Media owned Sit-up Ltd, a UK-based broadcaster of home shopping television channels, as a joint venture from its launch in 2000 and in full from May 2005. It operated the channels Bid TV, Price Drop TV and Speed Auction TV, shown on digital satellite, cable, and terrestrial television and the internet. On 1 April 2009, Virgin Media confirmed it had sold Sit-up to Aurelius AG for an unspecified amount.

=== Virgin Media Pioneers ===
Virgin Media Pioneers was an online community for British entrepreneurs, providing tips, advice and networking. Founded in 2010, the company was an initiative of Virgin Media. In 2011 Virgin Media Pioneers launched the Control Shift Campaign which polled over 1,600 young aspiring entrepreneurs on changes the government could make to help them create new businesses. The campaign resulted in the introduction of a £10 million Youth Enterprise Loan.

=== UKTV ===
UKTV is a digital cable and satellite television network, formed through a joint venture between BBC Worldwide, a commercial subsidiary of the BBC, and Virgin Media. It is one of the United Kingdom's largest television companies. On 15 August 2011, Virgin Media agreed to sell its 50% stake in UKTV to Scripps Networks Interactive in a deal worth £339m. Scripps paid £239m in cash, and about £100m to acquire the outstanding preferred stock and debt owed by UKTV to Virgin Media. Completion of the transaction was contingent on regulatory approvals in Ireland and Jersey, which was received on 3 October 2011.

== Corporate affairs ==
=== Ownership ===
Following the completion of the merger between NTL and Telewest, and the acquisition of Virgin Mobile, the company agreed a 30-year licensing agreement with Sir Richard Branson's Virgin Group to use the Virgin brand, with a ten-year opt-out clause. Branson accepted a mix of shares and cash, making him a 10.7% shareholder of the combined company at the time.

In July 2007, Virgin Group hedged 37% of its stake in Virgin Media for $224m through a collared loan agreement with Credit Suisse, a transaction which enabled it to retain the voting and dividend rights. Virgin Group had the option of buying back the 12.8m Virgin Media shares it had mortgaged after two years, but in May 2009 decided against this. The funds were used at the time by Virgin Group to invest in other areas of its business, such as Virgin Green Fund, which was launched in September 2007, Virgin America and Virgin Mobile India. By December 2009, Sir Richard Branson's Virgin Entertainment Investment Holdings Limited held a minority holding of 21,413,099 Virgin Media common stock, making him the third largest shareholder.

Liberty Global announced on 5 February 2013 that they had agreed to buy the company for approximately US$23.3 billion (£15 billion) in a stock and cash merger. Shareholders approved the acquisition on 4 June, and the deal was completed on 7 June.

In 2020, it was announced that Virgin Media would merge with O2, creating a 50:50 joint venture, Virgin Media O2. It was reported the new company would be overseen by an eight person board of directors, split equally between Liberty Global and Telefónica, with the chairman rotating every few years, between the two companies.

=== Market share ===
Ofcom’s 2024 Communications Market Report stated that Virgin Media had a 22% market share in the UK broadband sector. It was reported that they had 3.4 million TV subscribers in 2021, with streaming services disrupting the market considerably.

=== Advertising ===
Virgin Media launched in February 2007, with a public relations event and expensive advertising campaign covering major UK television channels, newspapers and billboards. Television advertising has featured actress Uma Thurman, comedian Ruby Wax, and actors Samuel L. Jackson, Marc Warren, and David Tennant.

Virgin Media also sponsored the Channel 4 reality TV show Big Brother in its eighth series in 2007 and its Celebrity Hijack and ninth series in 2008.

In October 2010, Virgin Media aired another campaign with a Looney Tunes character, Speedy Gonzales. He also served as a mascot for the company and was plastered everywhere throughout the UK, the London Underground station, and adverts that features him on the TV during advert breaks of The X Factor on ITV, appearing in-game, and throughout the web.

In 2012, Virgin Media launched a multimillion-pound ad campaign starring Usain Bolt and Virgin founder Sir Richard Branson to promote Virgin's superfast broadband service. The TV adverts were directed by Seth Gordon and involved Bolt impersonating Branson.

On 8 June 2016, Southampton F.C. announced that Virgin Media would become the club's shirt sponsor on a three-year deal.

== Controversies ==
=== Net neutrality ===
In April 2008, acting Virgin CEO Neil Berkett sparked controversy when he told Television, a magazine published by the Royal Television Society, "this net neutrality thing is a load of bollocks." According to the journalist, he claimed that any video content provider that refused to pay Virgin Media a premium for faster access would have to get stuck in "bus lanes," having their content delivered to end users at much slower speeds than that of paying content providers. Criticism was expressed on the internet, with calls for Virgin customers end their subscriptions and initiate a mass boycott.

According to Virgin Media, the comments were taken out of context and misinterpreted. A statement released by the company stated: "With Virgin Media rolling out a 50 Mb service later this year, we are uniquely equipped to cope with the demand for new bandwidth-hungry services. We strongly support the principle that the internet should remain a space that is open to all and we have not called for content providers to pay for distribution. However, we recognise that as more customers turn to the web for content, different providers will have different needs and priorities and in the long term, it's legitimate to question how this demand will be managed. We welcome an informed debate on this issue."

=== Crackdown on illegal filesharing of copyrighted material ===
On 2 April 2008, The Daily Telegraph reported that Virgin Media would conduct a trial to take action against subscribers who are illegally downloading copyrighted material from internet Peer-to-peer (P2P) services. Data of offenders would be provided by the British Phonographic Industry, and Virgin Media and the BPI would send a letter to the customer. Virgin Media and the BPI denied these reports and said they were only in talks on the matter. However, at least one person claimed to have received a letter threatening disconnection. At the time, the UK government was attempting to ban p2p users from the internet. This was condemned by the European Parliament on the grounds of privacy issues and the importance of internet access. In July 2008, the BBC reported that 800 Virgin Media customers were sent letters in envelopes that said "If you don't read this, your broadband connection could be disconnected". At least one recipient of the letter denied any wrongdoing.

On 26 November 2009, it was revealed that Virgin Media would trial deep packet inspection technology to measure the level of illegal file sharing on its network. On 22 January 2010, the European Commission confirmed that although it had not discussed the matter with Virgin Media, it would "closely monitor" the trial. Privacy International announced that it would make a criminal report to the Metropolitan Police, because it argued that the trial would breach laws requiring explicit informed consent or a warrant.

On 3 May 2012, it was reported that Virgin Media had become the first ISP in the UK to implement a web filter to block access to The Pirate Bay, in compliance with a UK High Court order in April, although there continued to be a number of mirrors, proxies, or VPNs.

=== Billing dead customers ===
In 2009, Virgin Media received criticism when it emerged that they were cutting off service to relatives of deceased customers for non-payment of bills. The story was publicised on BBC's Watchdog and musician Mitch Benn created a song called "Virgin Bills Dead People" about it. A similar incident occurred in 2013, where the bill also included an automated bank message stating the account holder was deceased.

=== Charging exit fees ===
Virgin Media formerly charged customers exit fees if they moved to a location where they would be unable to receive Virgin Media services. From 2017 to 2018, Ofcom investigated Virgin Media's early termination charges and found that Virgin had contravened Ofcom's General Conditions between 2016 and 2017 by failing to publish clear and up-to-date information about the charges, as well as setting them higher than the contractually agreed payments, and fined Virgin Media £7 million. As part of the investigation Virgin Media also agreed to make clearer to customers that early termination charges may apply when moving out of Virgin's network area, as well as allowing customers who move home within the network area to continue on their existing contract rather than start a new fixed term. In 2022 Virgin Media announced it would end the practice of charging customers an exit fee when moving to a home where its services are not available.

=== Data pimping ===
In early 2008, it was announced that the ISP arm of Virgin Media had entered into a contract (along with BT and TalkTalk) with the former spyware company Phorm (responsible under their 121Media guise for the Apropos rootkit) to intercept and analyse users' click-stream data, and sell the anonymised aggregate information as part of Phorm's OIX advertising service. The practice, which has become known as "data pimping", came under intense fire from various internet communities and other interested parties who believed that the interception of data is illegal under UK law (RIPA).

Though Phorm initially claimed Virgin Media had signed an exclusive contract and were committed to implementing Phorm's Webwise tracking system, Virgin Media subsequently distanced themselves and stated that they only signed a preliminary contract with Phorm to better understand the tracking technology, and were under no obligation to implement it. Reports on the Guardian website in May 2008 suggested Virgin Media were distancing themselves from the controversial system.

=== Wikipedia censorship ===
In December 2008, Virgin Media was one of several ISPs in the UK to attempt to censor its users' access to the Wikipedia article about the 1976 album Virgin Killer by stadium rock band Scorpions. The album cover generated controversy, as it featured the partially obscured image of a naked, underage girl. The article was blacklisted by the Internet Watch Foundation after a user complaint. The blacklisting was since rescinded.

=== 10-month exposure to data theft ===
In March 2020, it became known that the Virgin Media marketing database that included the personal details (phone numbers, home and email addresses) of 900,000 users was left unsecured for 10 months. The company admitted that a member of their staff had not followed the correct security procedures, which resulted in the system's vulnerability. At least one occasion of unauthorised access took place. After resolving, a forensic investigation was launched to gauge the extent of the data breach.

=== Failure to protect vulnerable customers ===
In December 2025, Virgin Media were fined £23.8m by Ofcom, the UK regulator of communications services. As of December 2025, this is the third largest fine ever imposed on a communication provider by Ofcom.

In November and December 2023, Virgin Media had been transferring customers from their analogue to digital telephone service. This arose due to the ageing of copper line services which are now classed as a legacy product and technology.

During the period of transition, Virgin Media failed to identify and protect customers who had personal telecare alarms.

Telecare alarm systems are often utilised by elderly or vulnerable people. In the event of an emergency or fall, a button is pressed and the call is connected to an alarm receiving centre, who assess the incident and arrange for appropriate emergency services to attend the property. The systems are reliant on an external telephone line being connected in order to operate. Affected customers were left for significant periods of time without functioning alarms.

While specific incidents have not been shared, Ofcom justified the fine imposed on the basis of the vulnerability of customers affected, the length of time they were left without a functioning service and the direct risk of harm caused. Virgin Media referred itself to the regulator following a series of serious incidents during transition, which – along with admission of its failings and co-operation with the investigation – meant the fine was discounted by 30%.

It is not clear how many customers were affected as this has not been shared by Virgin Media or Ofcom.

Virgin Media stated that they "didn't get everything right" during the transition, but additional processes and safeguards had now been put in place. The details of these have not been shared.

== See also ==
- Virgin Media Television (Ireland) – a separate Liberty Global subsidiary which acquired TV channels from TV3 Group in 2015.
