= Nexfibre =

British communications network provider

Nexfibre Networks Limited
- Trade name: Nexfibre
- Formerly: Liberty Fibre Ltd.; Liberty Networks Ltd.; Virgin Media Networks Ltd.
- Type: Joint venture
- Industry: Telecommunications
- Founded: 27 August 2019; 7 years ago
- Founder: Liberty Global
- Headquarters: London, England, UK
- Area served: United Kingdom
- Key people: Rajiv Datta (CEO); Fernando Molina (CTIO)
- Owners: Infravia Capital (50%); Liberty Global (25%); Telefónica (25%)
- Website: nexfibre.co.uk

Nexfibre Networks Limited, trading as Nexfibre (stylised as nexfibre), is a British telecommunications network provider that operates a gigabit-capable FTTP broadband network across the United Kingdom. It is a joint venture between Infravia Capital Partners and Opal Jvco Limited (the second joint venture between Liberty Global and Telefónica, the first being Virgin Media O2).

Nexfibre plans to offer open access wholesale provision of its network in the near-future, with Virgin Media currently the only provider to connect customers using the network.

== History ==
=== Company formation ===
The company was incorporated as Liberty Fibre Limited with Companies House in the United Kingdom on 27 August 2019, being a wholly owned subsidiary of Liberty Global. The company was later renamed to Liberty Networks Limited on 22 October 2019.

On 21 December 2020, the control of the company was transferred to Virgin Media O2, a joint venture between Liberty Global and Telefónica that brought two of the UK's largest telecommunications companies, O2 and Virgin Media, together. The company was subsequently renamed to Virgin Networks Limited on 7 January 2021.

=== Liberty Global, Telefónica and Infravia joint venture ===
In July 2022, it was announced Liberty Global and Telefónica had formed a joint venture with Infravia Capital Partners, with the partnership stated to be worth an initial £4.5 billion. It is the second joint venture between Liberty Global and Telefónica, whilst also being the second joint venture between Liberty Global and Infravia, with the companies having already teamed up to develop a similar fibre optic network in Germany. As a result of the partnership, Virgin Networks Limited was transferred to Opal Jvco Limited on 21 October 2022. Infravia, through subsidiary Crown Infra Bidco Limited, hold a 50% stake in the company whilst the remaining 50% is held by Opal Holdco Limited, the legal entity behind Liberty Global and Telefónica's joint venture. The company took on its current legal name of Nexfibre Networks Limited on 22 December 2022.

The purpose of the joint venture is to fund the build of a fibre-to-the-property (FTTP) broadband network across the UK, with a focus on connecting premises that are not already served by VMO2's existing infrastructure. Nexfibre intends to have an initial five million premises connected to its network by 2026, with plans to connect an additional two million premises beyond 2026. Like CityFibre, Nexfibre is aiming to provide open wholesale access to other internet service providers, with VMO2 being the first provider to use the network to connect customers. In addition to this, VMO2 is also assisting in the construction of the network, as well as providing technical support and expertise to support the rollout.

=== Network rollout ===
In June 2023, VMO2, Nexfibre's anchor wholesale client, launched commercial services using the company's XGS-PON full fibre network. VMO2 later launched a 2 Gbit/s package for eligible customers in February 2024. For an additional cost, the provider offers symmetrical download and upload speeds, making it the first major UK broadband provider to do so. It wasn't, however, the first broadband provider in the UK to offer a symmetric package above 2 Gbit/s, with Blackpool-based provider Yayzi offering a 2.3 Gbit/s service through the CityFibre network. At the time of launch, it was noted that the maximum speed falls short of what other altnets (alternative network providers) such as B4RN (10 Gbit/s), YouFibre (7 Gbit/s) and Community Fibre (3 Gbit/s) currently offer to consumers reached by their networks.

On 17 July 2023, Nexfibre announced it had secured a £250 million commitment from the UK Infrastructure Bank to support its full fibre network rollout. The funds came in addition to £1.4 billion in equity commitments from its owners.

On 6 September, it was announced that VMO2 had acquired altnet provider Upp in a move designed to expand Nexfibre's footprint by an additional 175,000 premises in the East of England. As part of the acquisition, VMO2 will focus on completing Upp's build, as well as integrating and aligning the network before transferring it to Nexfibre.

On 2 October, Rajiv Datta was appointed as the company's chief executive officer. Datta replaced interim CEO Bernardo Quinn, with Quinn taking a seat on the company's board. Datta had previously worked in the building and managing of large fibre-based networks at companies including Colt Technology Services and AboveNet. At the time of Datta's appointment, it was revealed Nexfibre had passed more than 500,000 premises. The following month, in November, the company unveiled its "nationwide rollout plan", with the initial rollout primarily focusing on areas in Cheshire, Kent and Durham in England, and areas in Wales, Scotland and Northern Ireland also included.

In a podcast interview with Zen Internet's founder Richard Tang in February 2024, Datta claimed the company will connect more homes to full fibre in the UK than any other altnet in 2024, including rival provider CityFibre, utilising the expertise of VMO2 in a period many altnets are slowing down due to operational difficulties.

In April 2024, Nexfibre announced it had achieved the milestone of having passed one million premises with its network. It took 14 months to achieve from the date its fibre build began, making Nexfibre the quickest network to achieve the number in the UK.

== Network milestones ==
As of November 2023, Nexfibre had passed 559,000 premises as part of its full fibre network rollout. It plans to reach five million premises by 2026, with a scope to expand to an additional two million premises beyond 2026.

Date	Coverage	Ref.
Nov 2023	559,000	
Apr 2024	1 million	
Jan 2025	2 million	

== Wholesale access ==
Like Openreach and CityFibre, Nexfibre operates solely as a telecommunications network provider, meaning customers must go through an internet service provider in order to get services that use the network. However, as of February 2024, Virgin Media O2 is the sole wholesale partner of the company. In an interview with Richard Tang, founder and CEO of Zen Internet, Nexfibre CEO Datta, in reference to his company opening up its network to wholesale access, stated: "We've got a few I.T. systems activities that are ongoing, which we expect will be complete within the coming months that will allow us to actually physically bring customers [ISPs] on to the network."

Zen, an ISP currently operating on the networks of CityFibre and Openreach, have confirmed they intend to become a wholesale client upon the platform's launch.

=== Wholesale partners ===
Service Provider	Started	Ref.
Virgin Media O2	June 2022	
Zen Internet	TBC	
