= Virgin Mobile (UK) =

Mobile phone service provider

Virgin Mobile Telecoms Limited
- Type: Subsidiary
- Industry: Mobile telephony
- Founded: 11 November 1999; 26 years ago
- Founder: Richard Branson
- Defunct: 31 August 2023; 3 years ago
- Fate: Ceased trading after merger of Virgin Media with O2; customers migrated to O2
- Products: Mobile telephony
- Parent: Virgin Media O2
- Website: www.virginmedia.com/mobile

Virgin Mobile UK was a mobile phone service provider.

The company was launched by Virgin Group and One2One in 1999 as the world's first mobile virtual network operator (MVNO), initially using the One2One network (which became T-Mobile UK, and then EE). Virgin Mobile offered contract mobile packages, as well as mobile broadband services. It sold its services directly, as well as through price comparison sites.

NTL:Telewest bought Virgin Mobile in 2006 and rebranded itself as Virgin Media in February 2007; Virgin Mobile became part of the quadplay of Virgin Media services. Virgin Media was purchased by Liberty Global in 2013, and merged with O2 in 2021.

In 2019, Virgin Mobile entered into a 5-year MVNO agreement with Vodafone, and by 2021, began transitioning its mobile services from EE to Vodafone. However, this transition was rendered redundant following Virgin Media's merger with O2, which was completed in 2021. As a result, Virgin Mobile became an MVNO on O2’s network, and by 2022, all Virgin Mobile customer traffic was fully migrated from EE and Vodafone to O2’s infrastructure.

In January 2023, it was announced that Virgin Mobile would cease operations as a separate brand. Starting in March 2023, Virgin Mobile began transferring its customer base to O2’s direct services. The migration was completed by 31 August 2023, at which point Virgin Mobile officially ceased trading.

Virgin Mobile sold contract airtime, mobile phones and mobile broadband, marketed through Virgin Media and its high street stores.

== History ==
Virgin Mobile was launched in November 1999 as a private joint venture between One2One (later T-Mobile UK, then EE) and the Virgin Group. The joint venture involved leasing network bandwidth from One2One and re-selling it under the Virgin Mobile brand, making it significantly cheaper to run than if Virgin operated its own network infrastructure. This marked the world's first mobile virtual network operator (MVNO) arrangement.

The company reported its first annual profit in 2003, following successful Christmas sales.

In 2004 Deutsche Telekom sold their 50% holding in Virgin Mobile to the Virgin Group, with the agreement that if the company were to become public in the following two and a half years they would receive 25% of the proceeds. The two companies had previously argued over the terms of the agreement made in 1999 and Richard Branson had filed a High Court action against T-Mobile.

Branson had considered making Virgin Mobile public in 2002. Eventually, dealing in shares of Virgin Mobile began on 21 July 2004, with 37% of the shares made available for sale as an initial public offering and the rest held by the Virgin Group. At the time, the company had 4.1 million customers and employed 1,400 staff in the UK; the listing valued the company at £500 million.

=== Acquisition by Telewest, 2006 ===
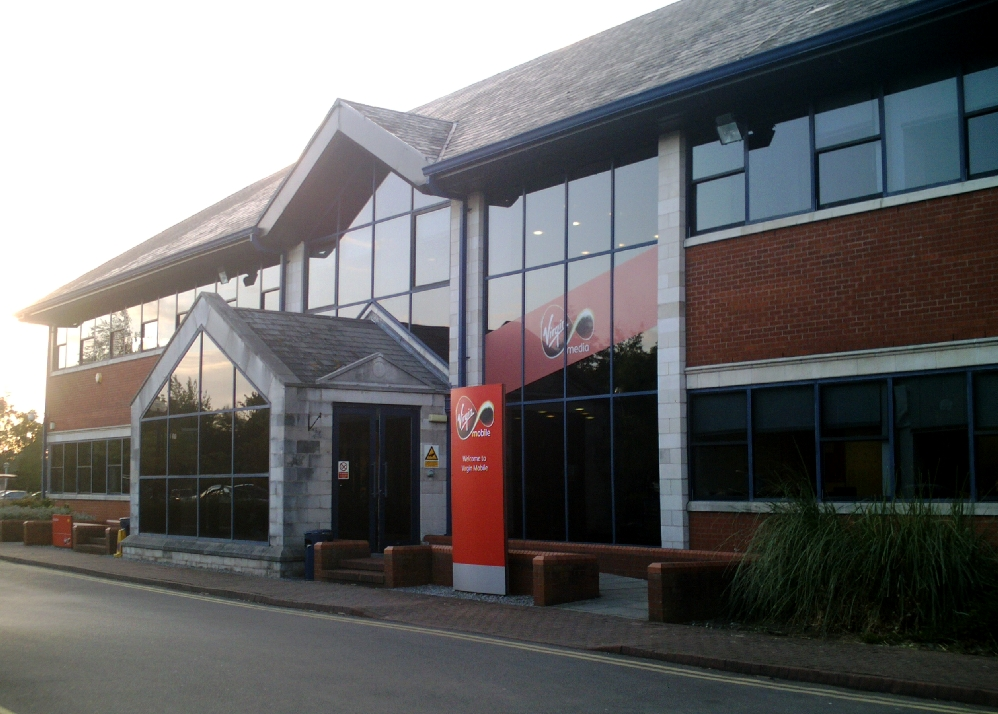
Virgin Mobile's former headquarters in Trowbridge, England

In December 2005 it was announced that Virgin Mobile UK was in talks with NTL:Telewest regarding a sale. The combination of Virgin Mobile and NTL:Telewest would create the United Kingdom's first "quadruple play" media company, bringing together TV, broadband internet access, mobile phone and fixed-line phone services, and allowing NTL:Telewest to use the Virgin brand.

Under the deal, Virgin owner Sir Richard Branson was understood to be planning to swap his controlling 72% stake in Virgin Mobile for a 14% holding in NTL:Telewest, which would make the billionaire entrepreneur the biggest shareholder in the combined group, and give him a share of future revenues.

The first bid of £817 million (US$1.4 billion) was rejected by Virgin Mobile's independent directors, who took the view that NTL:Telewest's bid "undervalued the business." Branson was reported to be confident that a restructured deal could be completed. The offer was increased in January 2006, to £961 million, or 372 pence per share.

On 4 April 2006, NTL:Telewest announced a £962.4 million recommended offer for Virgin Mobile. The offer had three options: 372 pence per share in cash; 0.23245 new NTL:Telewest Inc. shares for each Virgin Mobile share, worth 389 pence; or 0.18596 of an NTL:Telewest share, and 67 pence in cash, worth in total 387p. Branson indicated that he would accept the third option, which led to him receiving at least a 10.1% stake in the newly enlarged NTL:Telewest, and helped to fund the increased 372p per share in cash for the minority shareholders.

The independent directors of Virgin Mobile indicated to NTL:Telewest that they "intended unanimously to recommend that Virgin Mobile shareholders vote in favour of the scheme". NTL:Telewest acquired Virgin Mobile on 4 July 2006, delisting it from the London Stock Exchange and leaving Virgin Group with a 10.5% shareholding. NTL:Telewest rebranded under the Virgin Media name on 8 February 2007. The company set up in 2004, Virgin Mobile Group (UK) Limited, became dormant and was eventually dissolved in 2020.

Following the 2010 merger of T-Mobile and Orange to form EE, many Virgin Media customers were able to use phones previously locked to either of these companies, although EE SIMs would not work in phones locked to Virgin. However, the merger meant Virgin Mobile customers reported losing signal as EE consolidated the coverage of the two formerly separate networks. As part of the merger, Virgin Media continued the agreement with EE to use its network, and phones could roam between a formerly T-Mobile UK mast and a former Orange mast from early October 2011.

=== Liberty Global, 2013 ===
Virgin Media was sold to the American cable TV group Liberty Global in 2013.

In November 2016, Virgin launched 4G, with new tariffs and rollover of unused monthly data. Users on 4G plans had free access to WhatsApp and Facebook Messenger apps by "zero-rating".

Virgin Mobile originally offered pay-as-you-go contracts, but in October 2019 these were closed to new customers and tariffs were increased for existing customers.

On 6 November 2019, it was announced that Virgin Mobile would end their 20-year contract with BT and EE, and would use Vodafone's network from 2021, initially for five years. From January 2021 new customers were connected to the Vodafone network, and it was reported that existing customers would be moved from EE to Vodafone by early 2022. However, following the mid-2021 merger, Virgin Media O2 stated that notice to cancel the MVNO agreement had been given, and that the company intended to bring all consumer mobile services onto the O2 network.

=== Merger with O2, and closure ===
In May 2020, it was announced that the owner of Virgin Mobile, Liberty Global, was in talks with Telefónica, owner of the O2 network, to merge the two companies. Following approval by the Competition and Markets Authority, the merger to form Virgin Media O2 was completed on 1 June 2021. Virgin Media said that Virgin Mobile customers would see no immediate changes.

In January 2021, Virgin Media launched 5G services using the Vodafone network. Later that year, the company announced that their pay-as-you-go service would be discontinued between October 2021 and January 2022. The transfer of all Virgin Mobile customers from the Vodafone network to the O2 network was completed in 2022.

In January 2023, it was confirmed by Virgin Media O2 that Virgin Mobile would close, with all customers moving from Virgin Mobile to O2; migration started in March 2023 and was completed in August 2023. On 31 August 2023, sales of new Virgin Mobile SIM only and device plans were stopped and the network ceased operations.
