= Barclay Knapp =

American business executive and academic

- Other name: J. Barclay Knapp
- Education: Johns Hopkins University (BA, 1979); Harvard Business School (MBA, 1983)
- Occupations: Business executive; academic
- Known for: Co-founder and former chief executive of International CableTel/NTL; senior fellow at Johns Hopkins University

Barclay Knapp (sometimes credited as J. Barclay Knapp) is an American business executive and academic. He co-founded International CableTel in the early 1990s and served as chief executive of its successor NTL Incorporated, a major UK cable and telecommunications provider that later merged with Telewest and rebranded as Virgin Media. He is a senior fellow at the center for Financial Economics in the Johns Hopkins University Department of Economics and has been associated since the 2020s with DeepGreenX, serving as its chief executive.

== Early life and education ==
Knapp is a graduate of Johns Hopkins University (BA, 1979). Contemporary profiles also note subsequent study at Harvard Business School, where he earned an MBA in 1983.

== Career ==
=== Cellular Communications and International CableTel ===
Early in his career, Knapp worked with the founders of Cellular Communications, Inc. in the United States. In 1993 he co-founded and floated International CableTel on Nasdaq, taking advantage of UK regulatory changes that allowed cable companies to offer telephony. CableTel acquired NTL (the former engineering arm of the Independent Broadcasting Authority) in 1996 and adopted the NTL name.

A biographical CV published by Invest Northern Ireland lists Knapp as founder and vice-chairman of International CableTel plc and details his roles during the company's UK expansion.

=== NTL restructuring and departure ===
Following rapid consolidation at the turn of the century, NTL was hit by the telecom downturn and high leverage. In May 2002, NTL filed for Chapter 11 bankruptcy protection in the United States as part of a restructuring plan that swapped roughly $11 billion of debt for equity. Knapp stepped down as chief executive later that year and left the company in 2003. In a 2007 interview he reflected on the episode and the subsequent industry consolidation.

NTL later merged with Telewest and, following a brand licensing agreement with Virgin, rebranded as Virgin Media in 2007.

=== Academic and later activities ===
Knapp has remained active as an investor and adviser and is a senior fellow at the Center for Financial Economics at Johns Hopkins University, where he contributes to work on corporate finance and restructuring. He is also the namesake benefactor of the James B. Knapp Dean endowed deanship in the Krieger School of Arts and Sciences, established by university trustee J. Barclay Knapp in 1999.

Since the mid-2020s, Knapp has served as chief executive officer of DeepGreenX, a company developing a platform focused on sustainability-linked data and assets. In August 2025, DeepGreenX filed an amended registration statement with the U.S. Securities and Exchange Commission for a proposed listing of American depositary shares on the New York Stock Exchange. In October 2025, the company submitted a formal request to withdraw its planned public offering.

In early 2026, a Hong Kong weekly magazine published an investigative report alleging that some former investors of the Hong Kong–based iFree Group had been encouraged to transfer their shareholdings to DeepGreenX in connection with a proposed overseas listing, raising concerns about investor protections and regulatory status. DeepGreenX denied the allegations, stating that it had no direct investment relationship with iFree Group and that the magazine's report contained factual inaccuracies, adding that it had not been contacted for verification prior to publication.
