= Mike Fries =

CEO of Liberty Global

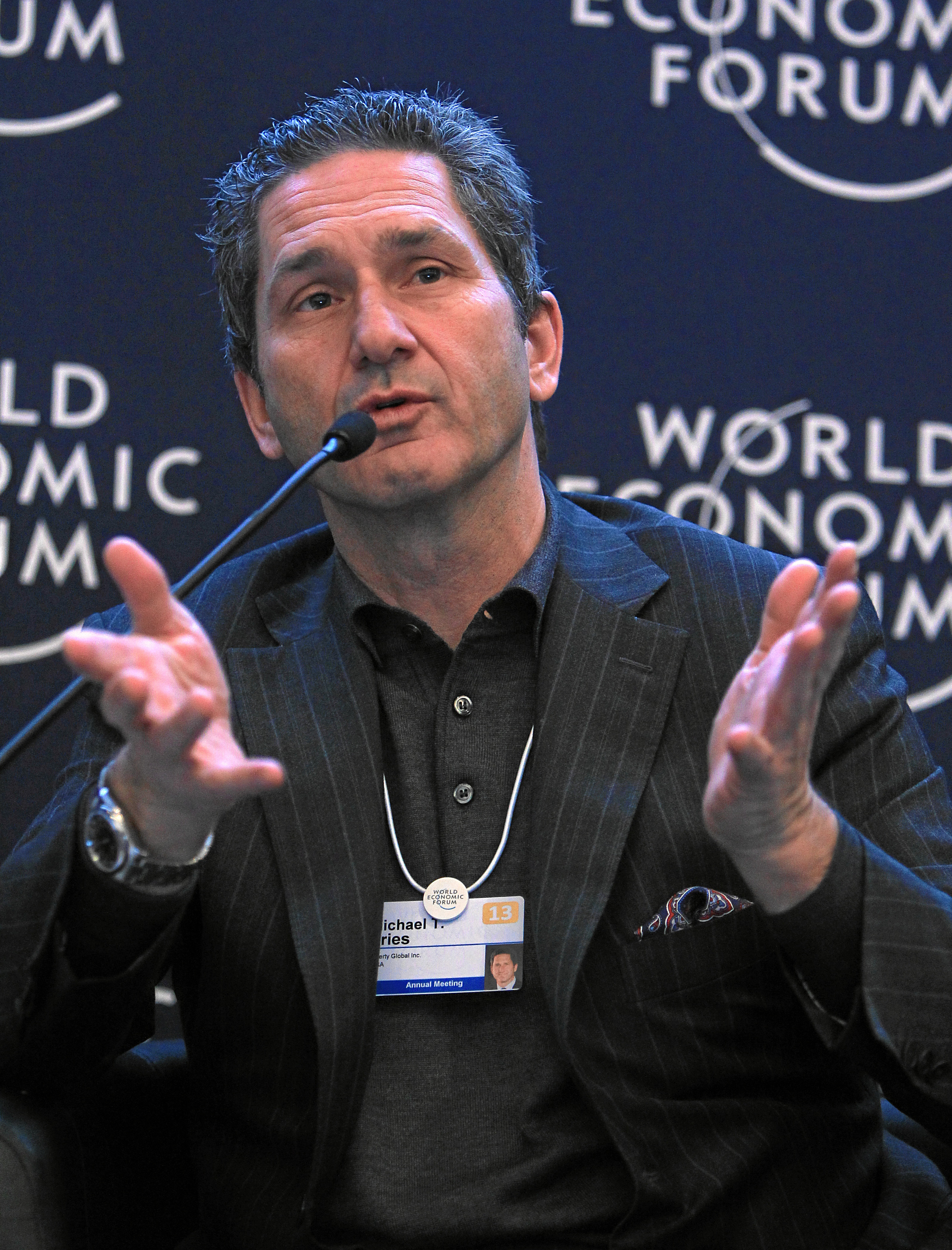
- Born: February 6, 1963 (age 63)
- Education: Wesleyan University (BA); Columbia University (MBA)

Mike Fries is chief executive officer and vice chairman of Liberty Global, an international television and broadband company. He was a founding member of the management team that launched the Company’s international expansion.

== Early life and education ==
Fries grew up in Los Angeles, California as the sixth of eight children. His father, Charles Fries, was a film and television producer. Fries attended Wesleyan University, where he earned his B.A., and went on to earn an M.B.A. degree from Columbia Business School.

== Business career ==
Fries started his career as an investment banker. In 1990, he became the fifth employee of United International Holdings which later became UnitedGlobalCom Inc. In 1995, he was the president of the company's Asia-Pacific holdings, which included (for example) a 49% stake in a microwave relay network spanning fourteen cities in Hunan province. He eventually served as President and CEO of UnitedGlobalCom from 2004 until it merged with Liberty Media International in 2005, forming Liberty Global. Upon the merger, Fries was appointed president and CEO of Liberty Global in June 2005 and serves as a member of its two-person executive committee along with John C. Malone.

In 2017, Fries was appointed Executive Chairman of Liberty Latin America. He serves on the corporate boards of Grupo Televisa and Lionsgate Entertainment. Additionally, he serves as trustee for CableLabs, The Cable Center, and The Paley Center for Media, and is the Digital Communications Governor and Steering Committee Member of the World Economic Forum.

== Philanthropy ==
Fries is a member of the board of trustees of Wesleyan University, and in 2017, the Fries Center for Global Studies was dedicated in recognition of his generosity to the school. He is also on the Board of Overseers for Columbia Business School. Fries and his wife, Michelle Fries, are trustees and lead donors to the Museum of Contemporary Art Denver and are also involved in organizations including the Denver Film Society, the Colorado Symphony, Biennial of the Americas, ACE Scholarships, and Denver School of Science and Technology.

== Honors ==
Fries has been recognized with honors including Ernst & Young's Entrepreneur of the Year in Media, Entertainment and Communications, Industry Leader of the Year by Digital TV Europe, and induction into the Broadcasting & Cable Hall of Fame and the Cable Hall of Fame.

== Personal life ==
Fries is married to Michelle Fries. He lives in Holland Park, London, and had two daughters.
