= T-Mobile UK =

Former UK mobile network

T-Mobile (UK) Limited
- Logo used from 2002-2010, 2010-2015
- Trade name: Mercury One2One (1993–1997); One2One (1997–2002); T-Mobile UK (2002–2010)
- Formerly: Mercury Personal Communications Limited (1992–1999); One 2 One Personal Communications Limited (1999–2002)
- Type: Subsidiary
- Industry: Telecommunications
- Founded: 7 September 1993; 33 years ago (as Mercury One2One)
- Defunct: 1 July 2010; 16 years ago (company renamed Everything Everywhere Limited); February 2015; 11 years ago (as a brand of EE)
- Fate: Renamed Everything Everywhere Limited following merger with Orange UK
- Successor: EE
- Headquarters: United Kingdom
- Area served: United Kingdom
- Products: Mobile telecommunications products and services
- Parent: EE (As a brand of the company)
- Website: t-mobile.co.uk at the Wayback Machine (archived 2014-03-21)

T-Mobile (UK) Limited, trading as T-Mobile UK, was a mobile network operator in the UK. First launched as Mercury One2One (stylised one2one) on 7 September 1993 by Mercury Communications, a subsidiary of Cable & Wireless, it was the UK's third mobile network - introducing innovative pricing like free evening and weekend calls to disrupt the market then dominated by BT Cellnet and Vodafone - and the first in the world to operate on the GSM 1800 band.

In 1999, Deutsche Telekom acquired One2One from Cable & Wireless and MediaOne for approximately £8.4 billion. That year, One2One became the world's first network to provide wireless network infrastructure to a mobile virtual network operator (MVNO) when Virgin Mobile was launched as a joint venture between One2One and Virgin Group. One2One was rebranded as T-Mobile UK in 2002, aligning it with Deutsche Telekom's global T-Mobile brand. T-Mobile launched its 3G network in 2004.

In 2010, Deutsche Telekom and France Télécom merged their respective T-Mobile UK and Orange UK businesses, forming a 50:50 joint venture, Everything Everywhere Limited (a renaming of T-Mobile UK's legal entity). The joint venture allowed T-Mobile customers to utilise Orange's 2G signal, and vice versa.

In 2012, Everything Everywhere launched a consolidated network, branded as EE; the legal entity became EE Limited in 2013. EE continued to operate the T-Mobile and Orange brands until March 2015. Legacy SIM cards remained supported by EE.

The EE network is now owned by BT, who acquired the company in January 2016 for £12.5 billion.

== History ==
=== Launch of Mercury One2One and initial years ===
In December 1989, the British government awarded three Personal Communications Network licenses to develop digital mobile services on the 1800 MHz band: one to Cable & Wireless subsidiary Mercury Communications (then the main rival of British Telecom) via Mercury Personal Communications Limited (initially a joint venture between Mercury, Motorola, and Telefónica), one to Microtel (eventually Orange), and the other to Unitel Limited (a consortium whose shareholders included STC plc, Thorn EMI, US West, and Deutsche Bundespost Telekom), with the formal telecoms system licences granted on 9 July 1991.

On 15 July 1991, Mercury acquired Motorola's 40% stake in Mercury Personal Communications Limited following disagreement over directions. On 16 July 1991, Mercury Personal Communications and Unitel announced that they would share a common PCN network to cut start-up costs by around 40%.

In 1992, Mercury and Unitel's PCN operation were merged into Mercury Personal Communications, with the Unitel company changing its name to Mercury Personal Communications Limited on 18 May 1992; this is the company that would go on to trade as Mercury One2One.

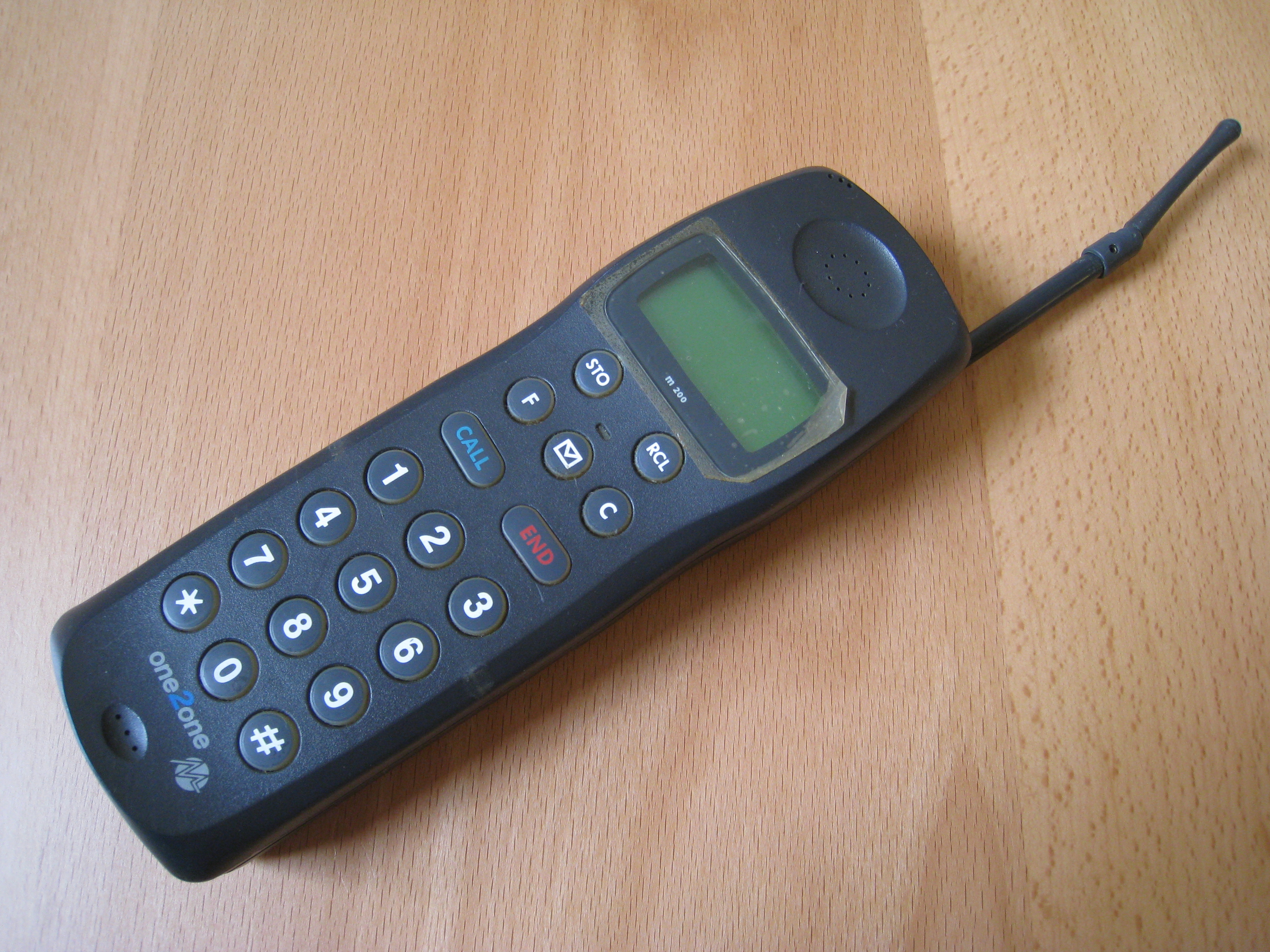
Siemens m200 hansdet with One2One branding

The Mercury One2One network was launched on 7 September 1993, becoming the world's first 1800 MHz GSM network, and the first mobile network to launch in the UK since Cellnet and Vodafone in 1985, ending BT and Racal's duopoly. By the time of the network's launch, it was a 50:50 joint venture between Mercury Communications and US West.

Motorola and Siemens developed the first GSM (DCS) 1800 handsets to support the Mercury One2One network, the m300 and m200 models respectively.

Initial service rollout began in major urban areas, starting with Greater London. The network was launched with an emphasis on serving individual consumers rather than corporate users, simultaneously aiming to compete with BT's landline service. By the end of 1994, One2One's subscriber base had grown to over 200,000, driven by competitive pricing such as free evening and weekend calls, and by the end of 1996, One2One had reached 40% UK population coverage.

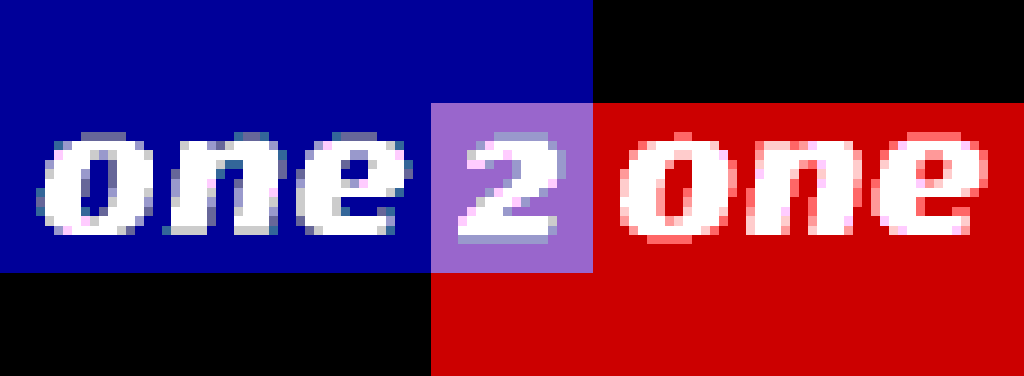
One2One logo from 1997 to 2002

In 1997, Mercury Communications was merged into the operations of its parent company Cable & Wireless plc, and the Mercury brand was phased out, addressing consumer confusion with Mercury's discontinued payphone services alongside an aim to elevate the image from a budget-oriented provider to one emphasising quality coverage. The 'Mercury' name was dropped from the One2One brand that year.

By September 1997, the One2One network had achieved approximately 90% population coverage.

Following the rebrand, One2One used a high-profile TV campaign featuring celebrities such as Ian Wright, Kate Moss and John McCarthy.

=== Acquisition of One2One by Deutsche Telekom and Virgin joint venture ===
In August 1999, One2One was acquired by Deutsche Telekom from joint owners Cable & Wireless and MediaOne (formerly US West) for approximately £8.4 billion.

Virgin Mobile logo

In November 1999, One2One and Richard Branson's Virgin Group launched Virgin Mobile - the world's first mobile virtual network operator (MVNO) through a 50:50 joint venture. Virgin Mobile pioneered the MVNO model, whereby Virgin Mobile resold airtime and capacity from One2One's infrastructure on a wholesale basis, quickly capturing over 675,000 subscribers by August 2001, occupying about 8% of One2One's capacity.

By the end of 2001, the One2One network had approximately 10.4 million subscribers.

In 2002, One2One rebranded as T-Mobile UK to align with Deutsche Telekom's global brand identity, supported by a £20 million advertising campaign and an emphasis on global connectivity. The network launched its GPRS service later that year. By the end of 2002, the network had approximately 12.4 million subscribers.

=== Expansion as T-Mobile UK ===
T-Mobile UK had reached 16.9 million subscribers by the end of 2006, growing to 17.3 million by the end of 2007.

T-Mobile offered both pay-as-you-go and pay-monthly contract phones. The pay-monthly contracts consisted of set numbers of minutes and 'flexible boosters' which allow the customer to change them month to month depending on their needs. Prior to this T-Mobile had a contract option known as 'Flext' which gave the user an amount of money to use for calls, texts, MMS and mobile internet as necessary. This was withdrawn in early 2010. There is no warning when pay-monthly customers exceed their monthly inclusive limit, leading to unexpectedly large bills. T-Mobile launched their 3G UMTS services in the Autumn of 2003.

On 12 December 2007, it was confirmed that a merger of the high-speed 3G and HSDPA networks operated by T-Mobile UK and 3 was to take place starting January 2008. This resulted in T-Mobile and 3 having the largest HSDPA mobile phone network in the country, with HSDPA access initially restricted to Web'n'Walk Plus customers and above.

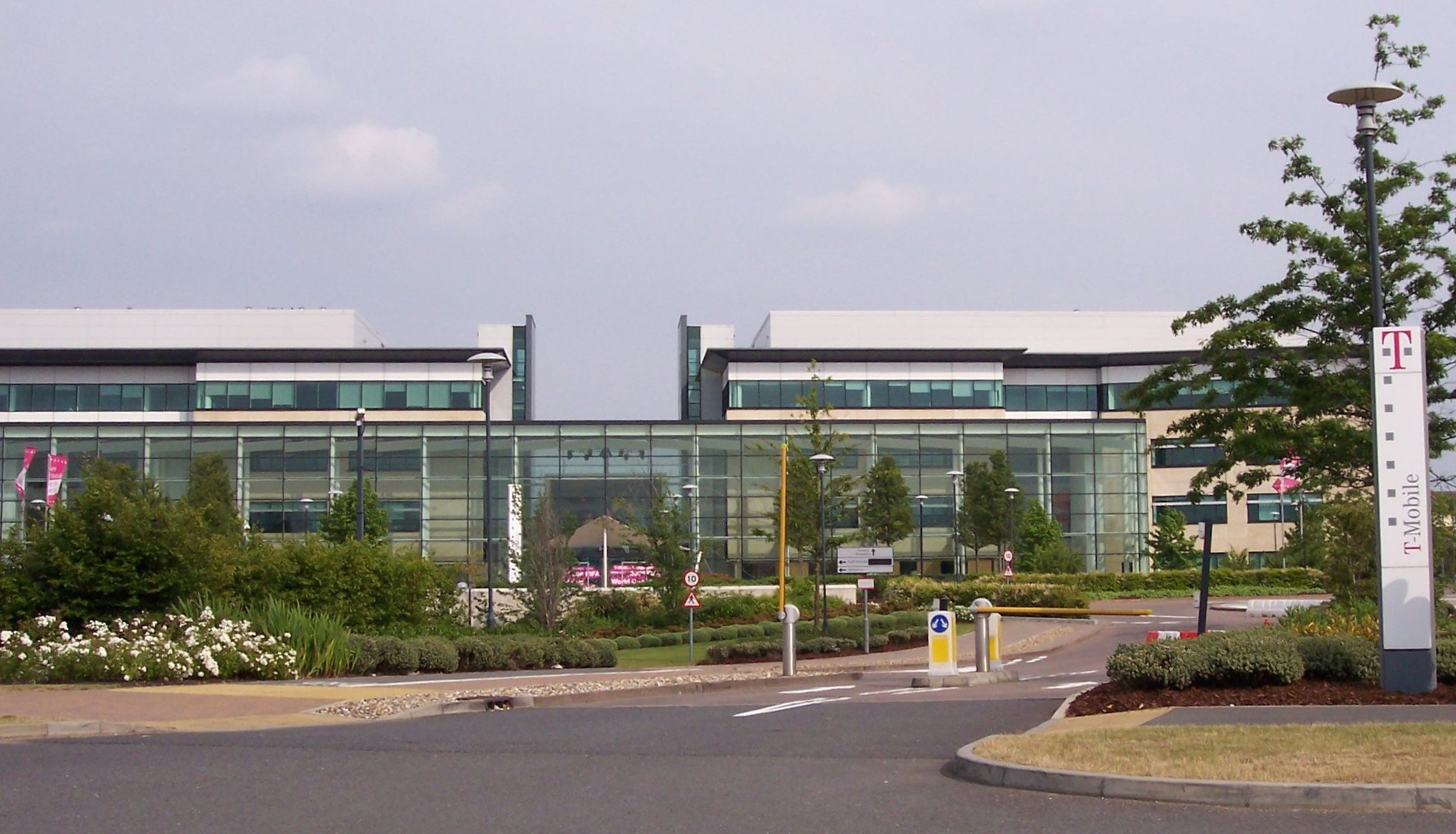
T-Mobile at Hatfield Business Park.

=== Merger with Orange UK ===
On 8 September 2009 France Télécom's Orange and T-Mobile parent Deutsche Telekom announced they were in advanced talks to merge their UK operations to create the largest mobile operator with 37% of the market. The long-term future of either brand was unclear, though EE stated that both would be retained for the first eighteen months at least. In 2013, parent company EE began to withdraw the T-Mobile brand. As of February 2015, new T-Mobile connections are no longer possible for new customers and in early 2019, they would have to switch to EE or have their service terminated

Consumer Focus and the Communications Consumer Panel sent a joint letter to the then Competition Commissioner Neelie Kroes in December 2009 asking for the merger to be investigated by authorities in the United Kingdom, rather than Brussels. The British Office of Fair Trading joined this call by asking the EU to allow it to investigate the proposed deal in February 2010, saying that it believed the merger could have a 'significant' effect on competition. On 1 March 2010 the European Commission approved the merger, on the condition that the combined company sell 25% of the spectrum it owns on the 1800 MHz radio band and amend a network sharing agreement with smaller rival 3.

On 1 April 2010 Deutsche Telekom and France Télécom finalised the deal and completed the merger of their UK based operations, causing Orange UK and T-Mobile UK to cease to exist as companies, although they continued as brands.

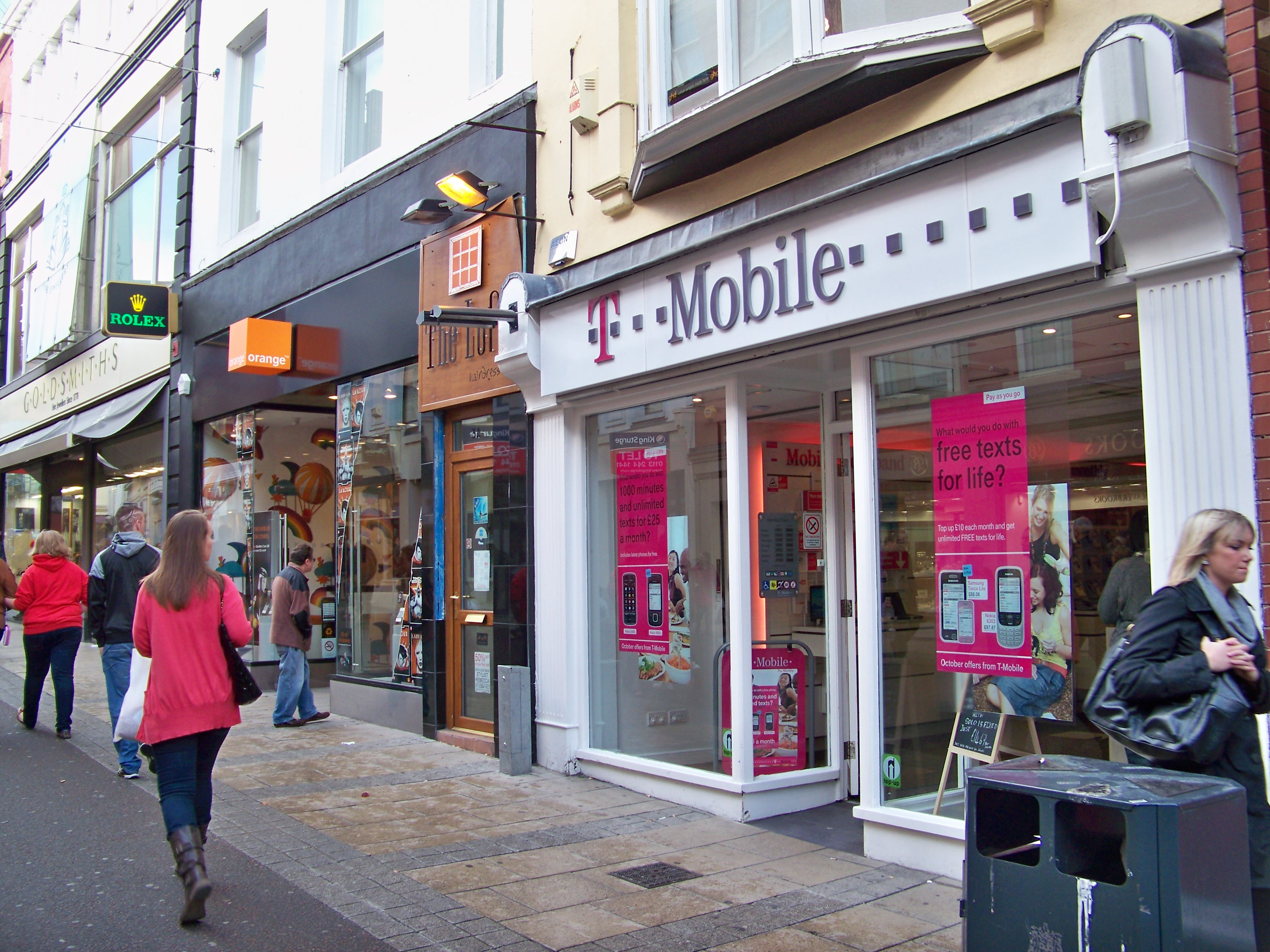
T-Mobile and Orange shops in Leeds in 2009. The T-Mobile store later closed with the Orange store converting to EE branding.

On 11 May 2010 it was announced that both the Orange and T-Mobile brands would remain on British high streets, although their new merged parent company will be called EE.

In September 2012, T-Mobile's parent company EE announced that all Orange and T-Mobile stores were to be re-branded as 'EE' stores by 30 October 2012, the launch date of their 4G network, offering products from all three brands of the company. As a result, there were 700 EE stores open in the UK. As of February 2015, EE stores only offer EE products, with T-Mobile services withdrawn.

T-Mobile's UK network was also used as the network behind Virgin Mobile UK (the world's first virtual mobile operator), for both 2G and 3G signals. Post-merger, Virgin Mobile continued to run on the EE network until they migrated to Vodafone.

In February 2015, T-Mobile UK and Orange UK tariffs were no longer offered to new or upgrading customers. In January 2016 BT acquired EE for £12.5 billion.

=== Mobile broadband fair use policy change ===
Effective 1 February 2011 T-Mobile UK lowered their fair-use capacity limit on Internet usage from 3GB to 500MB per month and clarified that Internet access using their mobile broadband service in reality only allows browsing the Internet using static websites. T-Mobile says:

"Browsing means looking at websites and checking email, but not watching videos, downloading files or playing games. We've got a fair use policy but ours means that you'll always be able to browse the Internet, it's only when you go over the fair use amount that you won't be able to download, stream and watch video clips."

This limited customers ability to use services such as Video chat/conference, Online streaming radio/TV news etc. or accessing e-mail attachments and playing online games or even downloading updates. Initial reports were that this was for all users, but after threats of contract breaches it was announced that it would apply to new and upgrading customers only - existing contracts would be honoured.

== 2009 data breach ==
In November 2009, T-Mobile UK was the subject of an investigation by the Information Commissioner's Office following the involvement of some T-Mobile employees in the illegal trade of personal data of millions of customers, in breach of the Data Protection Act 1998.

On 17 November 2009, T-Mobile admitted that it faced a consumer backlash after it was revealed that due to its own lax data security controls an employee had been selling customer data to third party companies. The mobile operator admitted that one of their own employees is facing prosecution after selling personal details of thousands of British customers to rival companies in a major breach of UK data protection laws. UK Information Commissioner Christopher Graham said the data was sold for “substantial amounts of money” to brokers working for other mobile phone companies. The privacy watchdog said it planned to prosecute and would push for jail terms for anyone convicted. Rival companies bought the information and used it to make cold calls to the customers offering them a new contract with a new network.
