= Virgin.net =

Former Internet service provider in the UK

- Type: Subsidiary
- Industry: Telecommunications
- Founded: 1996
- Defunct: 2015
- Fate: merged into parent
- Area served: United Kingdom
- Products: Broadband internet
- Parent: Virgin Media
- Website: virginmedia.com

Virgin.net was an Internet service provider (ISP) operating in the United Kingdom. It launched in November 1996. Once a joint venture between NTL and the Virgin Group, the ISP became wholly owned by NTL in September 2004.

The company sold a range of ADSL broadband packages through BT landlines to those living outside areas served by NTL's cable television network. Virgin.net broadband customers could receive up to 8 Mbit/s downstream and 400 kbit/s upstream, with usage allowances depending on which package the user takes.

Virgin.net also offered bundled phone services via Carrier Preselect (CPS) to broadband subscribers. Subscription based and subscription free dial-up Internet access was also available. Like most ISPs, Virgin.net had a web portal, covering topics such as music, movies, travel, technology and motoring.

In February 2007, the company was incorporated into the newly established Virgin Media as Virgin Media Beyond Cable. In November 2014, Virgin Media reached an agreement to sell its ADSL business (the former Virgin.net service) to TalkTalk Group, allowing Virgin to focus on its cable broadband offering.

Customers began transferring to TalkTalk from February 2015.

== See also ==
- Virgin Webplayer
