= Virgin Media Business =

British telecommunications service

Virgin Media Business Limited
- Company type: Subsidiary
- Industry: Internet; Telecommunications
- Founded: 11 February 2010; 16 years ago (as Virgin Media Business)
- Headquarters: Reading, England, UK
- Key people: Peter Kelly (Managing Director)
- Products: Broadband
- Parent: Virgin Media O2
- Website: virginmediabusiness.co.uk

Virgin Media Business Limited is a telecommunications provider specialising in providing services to businesses in the United Kingdom. The company is a subsidiary of Virgin Media, and as of 1 June 2021, parent company of Virgin Media O2, formerly named ntl:Telewest Business until 11 February 2010.

== History ==
During November 2010, Virgin Media Business re-certified its Ethernet portfolio under MEF (Metro Ethernet Forum) 9 and 14 service validation structure.

Later that month, it committed its support for the nationwide fibre-optic network to the UK Government to underpin the Public Services Network, the Cabinet Office ‘network of networks’ for public sector organisations.

In January 2011, London Grid for Learning (LGfL) selected Virgin Media Business to power a £200 million framework agreement to transform the delivery of public services in and around London.

In February 2011, the company offered data centres access to carrier grade connectivity.

The company was awarded an interim Public Services Network security accreditation in April 2011. The accreditation meant that it was allowed to operate as a Direct Network Service Provider (DNSP) and a Government Conveyance Network Service Provider (GCNSP). Full accreditation was awarded in July 2011.

During May 2011, the company partnered with data centre provider, ICM, to launch a Colocation service (renting out space for servers and other computing hardware).

The service offers businesses access to 11 data centres across the UK.

June 2011 saw the company and Westminster City Council launch a new £190 million pan-London IT framework.

In July 2011, the company was awarded one of three places on the Government Procurement Service Managed Telecommunications Convergence Framework (MTCF). The framework was to act as a resource for public sector organisations to buy Public Services Network compliant technologies.

Virgin Media Business has a nationwide fibre optic Next Generation Network. Organisations working with Virgin Media Business include London City Airport, Arqiva, Hampshire, Isle of Wight Partnership and South West Water.

== Services ==
In September 2010, Virgin Media Business launched Big Red Internet, a business Internet service, without constraints or extra charges.

In September 2011, the organisation signed a deal with Mobile Broadband Network Ltd to provide a synchronous Ethernet mobile backhaul network – expanding the bandwidth available to Hutchinson 3G UK and EE for their 3G and 4G network requirements with 1 gigabit per second connectivity.

In September 2011, the division announced that it had partnered with Savvis to launch its first true cloud product, the Virtual Private Data Centre (VPDC).
