= Infravia Capital Partners =

French private equity fund based in Paris

InfraVia Capital Partners
- Type: Société par actions simplifiée
- Industry: Investments
- Founded: 2008; 18 years ago
- Founders: Vincent Levita and Laëtitia Feraud
- Headquarters: Paris, France
- Products: Private equity fund
- Website: infraviacapital.com

Infravia Capital Partners is a French private equity fund based in Paris. The investment company acquires stakes infrastructure and technology growth companies. The focus is on companies that have high development momentum, InfraVia then works with management to support them towards growth.

== Major investments ==
It acquired a large stake in data centre firm Next Generation Data, based in Newport, Wales for about £100 million in 2016, and two Swiss data center businesses, Green.ch and Green Datacenter, from Altice in 2017.

It bought the Mater Private Hospital for about €500 million in 2018.

It is a majority shareholder in Cignal, a telecommunications infrastructure provider in Ireland. It also has interests in the Irish nursing home sector.

It is part of a joint venture with Liberty Global and Telefónica to build a new fibre network in the UK covering up to 7 million homes.
