= Liberty Global =

International telecommunications and television company

Liberty Global Ltd.
- Type: Public
- Traded as: Nasdaq: LBTYA (Class A); Nasdaq: LBTYB (Class B); Nasdaq: LBTYK (Class C); Russell 1000 components (LBTYA, LBTYK); LSE: 0XHR (Class A); LSE: 0XHS (Class C); BMV: LBTYAN (Class A); WBAG: LBTA (Class A); WBAG: LBTC (Class C); FWB: 1LG (Class A); FWB: 1LGC (Class C)
- ISIN: GB00B8W67662; GB00B8W67779; GB00B8W67B19; US5305551013; US5305552003; US5305553092
- Industry: Telecommunications; Mass media
- Predecessors: Liberty Media International; UnitedGlobalCom
- Founded: 2005; 21 years ago in Douglas County, Colorado, U.S.
- Headquarters: London, England; Amsterdam, Netherlands; Denver, Colorado, U.S.
- Key people: John C. Malone (Chairman Emeritus); Mike Fries (Chairman and CEO)
- Products: Broadband internet; Cable television; Telephony; Mobile; Direct-broadcast satellite
- Revenue: ▼US$7.20 billion (2022)
- Operating income: ▼US$2.37 billion (2022)
- Net income: ▼US$1.47 billion (2022)
- Total assets: ▼US$42.90 billion (2022)
- Total equity: ▼US$22.57 billion (2022)
- Owner: John C. Malone (30.37% voting interest)
- Number of employees: 23,000 (2020)
- Subsidiaries: Virgin Media O2 (50%); VodafoneZiggo (90%)
- ASN: 6830
- Website: www.libertyglobal.com

Liberty Global Ltd. is a British-Dutch-American multinational telecommunications company domiciled in Bermuda, with headquarters in London, Amsterdam and Denver. Its respective legal names are Liberty Global Holdings Limited (UK), Liberty Global B.V. (Netherlands) and Liberty Global, Inc. (United States), with the first of these being publicly traded. It was formed in 2005 by the merger of the international arm of Liberty Media (in turn, a spin-off of American cable-television group TCI) and UnitedGlobalCom (UGC).

Liberty Global had an annual revenue of $11.5 billion in 2019, with operations in six countries and 20,600 employees. It has 10.8 million cable service subscribers, or 25.3 million revenue generation units (RGU), combining video, internet, and voice customers.

== History ==
Liberty Global Inc. was founded in 2005 when Liberty Media International, Inc. (LMI) and UnitedGlobalCom, Inc. (UGC) merged. LMI and UGC became subsidiaries of Liberty Global. UGC founder was Gene Schneider. UGC was also built on acquisitions. United International Holding, later called UGC, acquired 50% of UPC from Dutch electronic concern Philips in 1995, and 100% in 1997.

The new entity had operations in 18 countries and networks over approximately 23 million homes, making it one of the largest broadband services companies in the world.

Liberty acquired German company Unitymedia in November 2009 for $5.2 billion. In 2010, Liberty sold its stake in Jupiter Telecommunications, a Japanese telecommunications-services provider.

On 9 November 2012, Liberty Global acquired Puerto Rico-based cable company OneLink Communications.

In January 2013, Liberty Global raised its stake in Belgium-based Telenet from 50.2% to 58%. In June 2013, Liberty Global acquired British cable group Virgin Media for $24 billion in cash and stock. The acquisition was noted by The New York Times as one of the 10 largest cable deals of all time. It was reported that this acquisition would make Liberty Global the largest broadband company in the world. Liberty agreed in October 2013 to sell Chellomedia for $1.035 billion except for its Benelux unit to AMC Networks.

Liberty Global announced it would be acquiring Dutch cable company Ziggo for €10 billion in January 2014. The acquisition was completed in November 2014, when the services of UPC Nederland began to be merged into the new business. Liberty Global and Discovery Communications became joint owners of All3Media in May 2014 in a £500 million joint deal. In July 2014, Liberty Global acquired a 6.4% stake in ITV plc, valued at £481 million. Liberty's stake in the company increased to 9.9% in July 2015.

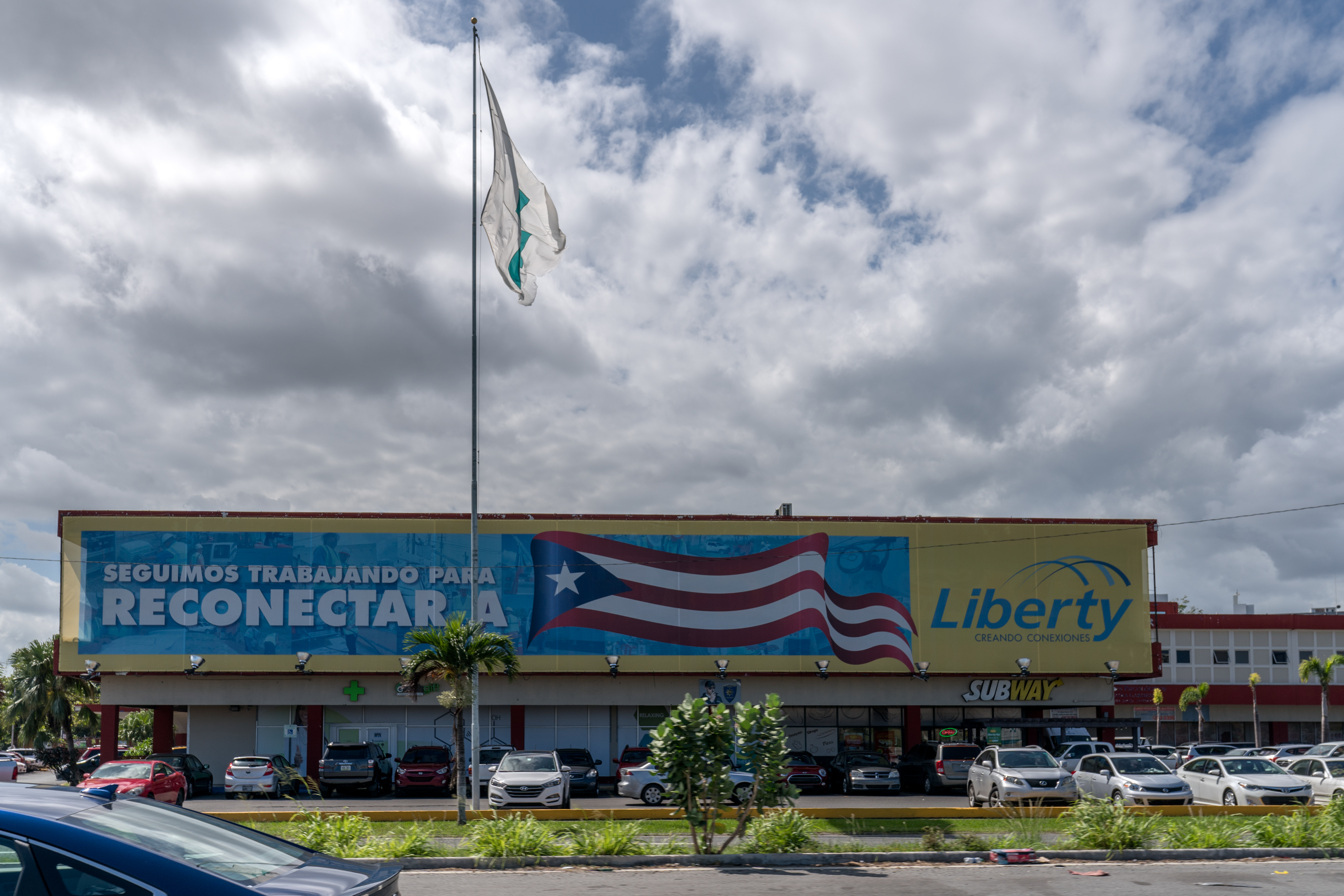
Liberty Puerto Rico reconstruction sign in San Juan, Puerto Rico

In November 2015, Liberty Global announced its acquisition of Cable & Wireless Communications. The $5.3 billion deal expanded Liberty Global's presence into the Caribbean & greater Latin America. The acquisition was completed in May 2016. In 2015, Liberty established the stock Liberty Latin American & Caribbean (LiLAC) focusing on Panama and the Caribbean with assets in Chile and Puerto Rico. The company also owned a 49% stake in majority state-owned Trinidadian telco, TSTT, which it was eventually obliged to dispose of as the company itself competes with Liberty's wholly owned Trinidadian subsidiary, FLOW Trinidad. Liberty Global and Discovery Communications paid approximately $195 million for a 3.4% stake in Lions Gate Entertainment Group in November 2015. Liberty CEO Mike Fries joined the Lion's Gate board of directors as part of the acquisition.

Liberty invested £7.5 million in global broadband cable network Technetix in July 2016. In November 2016, Liberty Global's Virgin Media subsidiary released its Netflix and other app-enabled set-top V6 box. Liberty Global was also ranked 88th on the Forbes "World's Most Innovative Companies" list in 2016.

At the end of 2017, Liberty Global announced the decision to sell its operations in Austria, UPC Austria – the country's largest cable operator, to T-Mobile Austria for €1.9 billion, which was then rebranded Magenta Telekom.

In January 2018, Liberty Latin America spun off from Liberty Global. The new publicly traded company, Liberty Latin America Ltd., operates independently throughout parts of the Caribbean and South America.

On 9 May 2018, Liberty Global announced the sale of its operations in Germany, Hungary, Romania and the Czech Republic to Vodafone for €19 billion ($22.7 billion). The sale closed for $21.3 billion in July 2019. All of these operations, formerly named UPC (Unitymedia in Germany), were since rebranded to Vodafone. In December 2018, Liberty Global announced the sale of its DTH satellite TV operations in Hungary (UPC Direct), Czech Republic, Slovakia (in both named freeSAT) and Romania (Focus Sat) to M7 Group. Under M7 Group, Czech and Slovak operations were integrated with Skylink, Hungarian operations adopted Direct One name and logo, while Romanian operations retained its name, only changing its logo to match with its new parent.

In 2019, Liberty Global announced an initiative to offer broadband with speeds of 1 Gbps across several European cities through the company's GigaCities program.

In August 2020, Liberty Global announced that it would be buying Sunrise Communications AG for $7.4 billion. The company attempted to acquire Sunrise Communications multiple times; according to Mike Fries, the chief executive officer of Liberty Global, "It wasn't a question of 'is this a good deal?' only a matter of how it would get done". On the 11th November Sunrise became a subsidiary of Liberty Global.

In September 2021, Liberty Global announce the sale of its Polish operations to Iliad's subsidiary Play (P4) for $1.8bn. The transaction was closed on 1 April 2022.

In July 2023, Liberty Global's shareholders voted overwhelmingly for Liberty Global to redomicile from the United Kingdom to Bermuda. In November 2023, Liberty Global completed the redomicile.

In November 2024, Liberty Global announced the completion of the spin-off transaction of Sunrise. This transaction resulted in Sunrise becoming an independent public entity, operating autonomously in the Swiss telecommunications market. The move allowed Liberty Global shareholders to participate directly in Sunrise's future performance.

On 18 December 2025, Liberty Global sold the last UPC asset in Slovakia to E& PPF Telecom Group for €95 Million, marking the end to the former UPC business.

=== Merger with Vodafone in the Netherlands ===
In June 2015, Vodafone confirmed talks with Liberty Global focused on potential partnerships, but denied that a full merger was in the works. Liberty Global invested in Guavus, a data analytics company, in September 2015. In February 2016, it was announced that Vodafone and Liberty Global would merge Dutch operations. Liberty's Dutch subsidiary, Ziggo, would work with Vodafone's mobile network. Vodafone paid Liberty €1 billion as part of the joint venture valued at €3.5 billion. The deal was approved by the European Commission in August 2016. On 31 December 2016, the proposed merger of Liberty Global's and Vodafone Group's Dutch operations was completed, resulting in a joint venture called VodafoneZiggo Group Holding B.V.

=== Innovations and investments ===
In 2013–2016, Liberty Global invested EUR 14.5 billion in infrastructure, including investments to bring high-speed internet to four million more European households through new build and upgrades.

In October 2017, Liberty Global opened the Telenet Innovation Centre in Brussels, its second innovation hub alongside the Tech Campus near Amsterdam. The Innovation Center is focused on testing Internet of Things (IoT) solutions and mobile technologies, including the introduction and preparation of 5G networks.

=== Video properties ===
Liberty Global offers Netflix in 30 countries in Europe, Latin America and the Caribbean and other video-on-demand platforms as MaxDome in Germany, Play and Play More in Belgium, and MyPrime in Poland, Czech Republic, Slovakia, Ireland, Switzerland and the Netherlands.

In 2017, Liberty Global partnered with affiliate Lionsgate and subsidiary premium channel Starz on a television series, The Rook. The show, which premiered in summer 2019, is adapted by Stephenie Meyer from the novel of the same name written by Daniel O'Malley.

In February 2018, Liberty Global announced a partnership with Amazon Prime Video on the television series called The Feed, premiering in 2019. The show was co-produced in partnership with the Amazon Studios division and launched as an on-demand programme in Europe, Latin and North America.

== Horizon TV ==
Horizon TV is Liberty Global's flagship platform with more than 10 million first-generation Horizon TV devices sold.

Liberty Global launched Horizon TV, a box to stream to televisions, in 2012. H2, an upgraded version of the Horizon box, was launched in 2013. The new system included an upgraded remote control with a QWERTY keyboard. A secondary box connects wirelessly to the main device allowing TV, DVR and VoD streaming to multiple rooms in a subscriber's house. Liberty partnered with ActiveVideo in 2013 to include ActiveVideo's CloudTV on the Horizon boxes.

Twitter was integrated into Horizon's mobile app library in 2016. The addition allowed live tweets to be overlaid onto the screen of a program being broadcast. Horizon TV was also launched in Austria in 2016, making it available in all three German-speaking countries where Liberty Global operates.

In September 2018, Liberty Global announced the next-generation video platform Horizon 4.

== Operations and shareholdings ==
Liberty Global operates through the following subsidiaries and shareholdings:

- Virgin Media O2 (50% ownership)
  - O2
    - giffgaff
    - Tesco Mobile (50% ownership)
  - Virgin Media (UK)
    - Virgin Media Business
- VodafoneZiggo (90% ownership)
  - Vodafone Netherlands
  - Ziggo
    - Ziggo Sport
    - Ziggo Sport Totaal
- Virgin Media Ireland
  - Virgin Media Television
  - Virgin Mobile
- Telenet (Belgium)
  - BASE
  - Play Media
    - Play4
    - Play5
    - Play6
    - Play7
    - Play Sports
- Canal+ (Poland) (17% ownership)
- ITV plc (United Kingdom) (5% shareholding)
  - ITV Media & Entertainment (sale to Sky Group pending)
  - ITV Studios

== Markets ==
=== Americas ===
Part of Liberty Global is separately listed as LiLAC (Liberty Latin America and Caribbean Group), operating in over 20 countries under the consumer brands VTR, FLOW, Cabletica, Liberty, Más Móvil and BTC, as well as having a sub-sea fiber network.

In January 2018, Liberty Latin America spun off the main company and began operating independently from Liberty Global.

Liberty Latin America's operations consist of Liberty Puerto Rico, a provider of pay-TV, Internet, and telephone services in Puerto Rico, and VTR, a Chile a cable provider of television, telephone, mobile, and internet services. Through the acquisition of Cable and Wireless Communications, Liberty Global has become the owner of the largest pay-TV and broadband provider in the Caribbean. In addition, the company also owns CWC's operations in the Seychelles named Cable and Wireless Seychelles.

=== Europe ===
Liberty Global serves six countries in Europe and is among the largest cable operators in Belgium, Ireland, the Netherlands, Slovakia, Switzerland and the United Kingdom.

==== Merger of Virgin Media with O2 UK ====
On 7 May 2020, it was announced that Liberty Global and Telefónica had been in talks to merge their UK businesses in a deal worth an estimated £31bn. The merger would see Virgin Media and O2 form a 50:50 joint venture, making the combined business one of the UK's largest entertainment and telecommunications companies, with annual revenues of approximately US$13.6 billion and over 46 million subs.

The merger was subject to customary regulatory approval and, if approved, was to be completed by mid-2021. The merger was completed on 1 June 2021.
