= Quadruple play =

In telecommunications, quadruple play or quad play is a marketing term combining the triple play service (broadband Internet access, television and landline phone) with mobile phone network operator service provisions. This service set is also sometimes referred to as "The Fantastic Four".

In addition to being a testament to technological convergence, quadruple play also involves a diverse group of stakeholders, from large Internet backbone providers to smaller startups.

Advances in LTE and other technologies are rapidly improving the ability to transfer information over a wireless link at various combinations of speeds, distances, and non-line-of-sight conditions.

"Mobile service provisions" refers in part to the ability of subscribers to purchase mobile phone like services, as is often seen in co-marketing efforts between providers of landline services. It also reflects the ambition to gain wireless access on the go to voice, internet, and content/video without tethering to a network via cables.

== Companies ==
In the United Kingdom, NTL:Telewest (later Virgin Media) became quad-play in July 2006 when it merged with Virgin Mobile. This offered a "quadruple play" of cable television, broadband Internet, landline phones, and mobile, with prices for some contracts as low as £30 a month. It is marketed as "the simplest way for customers to get all their household communications from one provider". BT Group launched its own quad play services in March 2015 ahead of its purchase of EE running its mobile offering on the EE network. In January 2017, Sky UK became quad-play through the launch of Sky Mobile.

In Hong Kong, PCCW first claims to be "the only operator in Hong Kong that offers a genuine quadruple-play experience". In 2016, HKBN entered the quad play market with a disruptive pricing strategy.

In the United States, many telephone companies like AT&T, Verizon, CenturyLink, Cincinnati Bell, Hawaiian Telcom, Consolidated Communications (formerly SureWest), and formerly, BellSouth, Embarq, Qwest, and Cox (in some markets), have quad-play bundling. Comcast's Xfinity began offering Xfinity Mobile in 2017, which is a mobile virtual network operator on the Verizon Wireless network.

== See also ==
- Dual play
- Fixed–mobile convergence
- Triple play
