= Comviq =

Swedish mobile phone flanker brand

- Industry: Telecommunications
- Founded: 1 July 1981
- Founder: Jan Stenbeck
- Headquarters: Stockholm, Sweden
- Website: www.comviq.se

Comviq (originally Comvik) is since 2009 a Swedish prepaid and postpaid mobile phone flanker brand, fully owned by Tele2. The original Comvik operation is the predecessor to two listed companies: Tele2 and Millicom.

== Comvik ==
The original Comvik was established in 1981 in an attempt to break the existing de facto state-sanctioned telecommunications monopoly held by Televerket at the time. During the 1980s, investor Jan Stenbeck's strategy was to pursue, break up and create alternatives to the existing Swedish monopolies in service sectors including telephony and media. In the late 1970s, Mr Stenbeck's Investment AB Kinnevik started to buy a number of smaller companies in Stockholm and Gothenburg that operated manual communication networks for car based equipment. Through an operator the driver could reach the public telephone network. Eventually these companies were merged and rebranded as AB Företagstelefon in Stockholm. In parallel – and in the quiet – the plans were more ambitious. Completely new equipment was purchased, new telephone terminals were developed and then on 1 July 1981 Comvik launched Sweden's first automatic analogue mobile telephony network, three months ahead of Televerket's launch of its NMT network.

Since Televerket had a monopoly on telecommunications and the radio spectrum, a conflict arose between Televerket and Comvik. After many very public arguments where Televerket even threatened to disconnect Comvik from the public telephone network, the then-non-socialist government gave Comvik permission to continue and expand to a limited extent. Comvik asked for and got a few more frequencies. Finally Comvik had 27 frequencies. Televerkets NMT system had 180 frequencies. Comvik had to expand into cell-based technology that today forms the basis of mobile telephony. The Swedish-based Ericsson sold no equipment to Comvik who instead had to develop the technology themselves using a mixture of suppliers. Comvik built up a customer base of 20,000 subscribers. In order to compete with Televerket they had a lower per-minute rate and offered free calls on evenings and weekends. Comvik also launched several value added services aiming at small businesses.

Comvik received the “Service Company of the Year” award by the Swedish business newspaper Dagens Industri in 1987 on the grounds that Comvik broke up the existing monopoly and introduced customer choice. Because of the competitive situation, it was difficult to operate. There were no additional frequencies available, the customer base could not be increased and the company suffered heavy losses. However, with the stoic attitude and changing public attitudes versus monopolies, Comvik was finally awarded a formal GSM license in 1988 to be operated in competition with Televerket.

=== Comvik International ===
With the help from its Comvik experience Kinnevik also acquired mobile licenses around the globe and initially used the “Comvik International” moniker. Networks were built in Hong Kong, Vietnam (MobiFone), Mauritius (Emtel) and other countries. Those activities later became the founding pillars of Millicom International Cellular, of which the latter now primarily operates in various African and South American countries under the Tigo brand name.

== Recent history ==
In 1991, Kinnevik branded its new GSM network as “Comviq” and said network was finally launched the following year. The old Comvik name was retained for the parallel-operating analog network for another few years before it was phased out.

Comviq GSM merged with Tele2 in 1997, but the name Comviq was retained as a brand, together with Tele2's own brand Tele2 Mobile. In 2004 name was changed to Tele2Comviq. In 2007 the brand was completely replaced by Tele2 brand.

In 1997, the parent company introduced Comviq Kontant as the first prepaid card in Sweden. Despite Tele2Comviq being dropped for GSM, the Comviq name was retained for the prepaid cards with a new logo and design introduced to distinguish it as a debit card. In 2009 the Comviq brand was re-launched again as a very price competitive and simplistic prepaid SIM card brand, also now including fixed-priced, no binding contract postpaid subscription plans. Nowadays, Comviq operates on 2G GSM, 4G LTE and (since 7 September 2021) on 5G NR on the Net4Mobility network which is also shared with Tele2 and Telenor Sverige, as well as on 3G UMTS on the SUNAB network which is also shared with Tele2 and Telia.

== See also ==
- T 641/00
