= 2G =

Second-generation mobile telecommunications standard

2G refers to the second generation of cellular network technology, which were rolled out globally starting in the early 1990s. The main differentiator to previous mobile telephone systems, retrospectively dubbed 1G, is that the radio signals of 2G networks are digital rather than analog, for communication between mobile devices and base stations. In addition to voice telephony, 2G also made possible the use of data services.

The most common 2G technology has been the GSM standard, which became the first globally adopted framework for mobile communications. Other 2G technologies include cdmaOne and the now-discontinued Digital AMPS (D-AMPS/TDMA), as well as the Personal Digital Cellular (PDC) and Personal Handy-phone System (PHS) in Japan.

The transition to digital technology enabled the implementation of encryption for voice calls and data transmission, significantly improving the security of mobile communications while also increasing capacity and efficiency compared to earlier analog systems. 2G networks were primarily designed to support voice calls and Short Message Service (SMS), with later advancements such as General Packet Radio Service (GPRS) enabling always-on packet data services, including email and limited internet access. 2G was succeeded by 3G technology, which provided higher data transfer rates and expanded mobile internet capabilities.

== History ==
In 1990, AT&T Bell Labs engineers Jesse Russell, Farhad Barzegar and Can A. Eryaman filed a patent for a digital mobile phone that supports the transmission of digital data. Their patent was cited several years later by Nokia and Motorola when they were developing 2G digital mobile phones.

2G was first commercially launched in 1991 by Radiolinja (now part of Elisa Oyj) in Finland in the form of GSM, which was defined by the European Telecommunications Standards Institute (ETSI). The Telecommunications Industry Association (TIA) defined the cdmaOne (IS-95) 2G standard, with an eight to tenfold increase in voice call capacity compared to analog AMPS. The first deployment of cdmaOne was in 1995. In North America, Digital AMPS (IS-54 and IS-136) and cdmaOne (IS-95) were dominant, but GSM was also used.

Later 2G releases in the GSM space, often referred to as 2.5G and 2.75G, include General Packet Radio Service (GPRS) and Enhanced Data Rates for GSM Evolution (EDGE). GPRS allows 2G networks to achieve a theoretical maximum transfer speed of 40 kbit/s (5 kB/s). EDGE increases this capacity, providing a theoretical maximum transfer speed of 384 kbit/s (48 kB/s).

Three primary benefits of 2G networks over their 1G predecessors were:

- Digitally encrypted phone conversations, at least between the mobile phone and the cellular base station but not necessarily in the rest of the network.
- Significantly more efficient use of the radio frequency spectrum enabling more users per frequency band.
- Data services for mobile, starting with SMS text messages then expanding to Multimedia Messaging Service (MMS).

== Evolution of GSM 2G ==
Cellular network standards and generation timeline. (Large titles on the colored area refer to the lines to their right.

=== 2.5G (GPRS) ===
2.5G ("second-and-a-half generation") refers to 2G systems that incorporate a packet-switched domain alongside the existing circuit-switched domain, most commonly implemented through General Packet Radio Service (GPRS). GPRS enables packet-based data transmission by dynamically allocating multiple timeslots to users, improving network efficiency. However, this does not inherently provide higher speeds, as similar techniques, such as timeslot bundling, are also employed in circuit-switched data services like High-Speed Circuit-Switched Data (HSCSD). Within GPRS-enabled 2G systems, the theoretical maximum transfer rate is 40 kbit/s (5 kB/s).

=== 2.75G (EDGE) ===
2.75G refers to the evolution of GPRS networks into EDGE (Enhanced Data Rates for GSM Evolution) networks, achieved through the introduction of 8PSK (8 Phase Shift Keying) encoding. While the symbol rate remained constant at 270.833 samples per second, the use of 8PSK allowed each symbol to carry three bits instead of one, significantly increasing data transmission efficiency. Enhanced Data Rates for GSM Evolution (EDGE), also known as Enhanced GPRS (EGPRS) or IMT Single Carrier (IMT-SC), is a backward-compatible digital mobile phone technology built as an extension to standard GSM. First deployed in 2003 by AT&T in the United States, EDGE offers a theoretical maximum transfer speed of 384 kbit/s (48 kB/s).

=== 2.875G (EDGE Evolution) ===
Evolved EDGE (also known as EDGE Evolution or 2.875G) is an enhancement of the EDGE mobile technology that was introduced as a late-stage upgrade to 2G networks. While EDGE was first deployed in the early 2000s as part of GSM networks, Evolved EDGE was launched much later, coinciding with the widespread adoption of 3G technologies such as HSPA and just before the emergence of 4G networks. This timing limited its practical application.

Evolved EDGE increased data throughput and reduced latencies (down to 80 ms) by utilizing improved modulation techniques, dual carrier support, dual antennas, and turbo codes. It achieved peak data rates of up to 1 Mbit/s, significantly enhancing network efficiency for operators that had not yet transitioned to 3G or 4G infrastructures. However, despite its technical improvements, Evolved EDGE was never widely deployed. By the time it became available, most network operators were focused on implementing more advanced technologies like UMTS and LTE. As of 2016, no commercial networks were reported to support Evolved EDGE.

== Phase-out ==
2G, understood as GSM and CdmaOne, has been superseded by newer technologies such as 3G (UMTS / CDMA2000), 4G (LTE / WiMAX) and 5G (5G NR). However, 2G networks were still available as of 2023 in most parts of the world, while notably excluding the majority of carriers in North America, East Asia, and Australia.

Many modern LTE-enabled devices had the ability to fall back to 2G for phone calls, necessary especially in rural areas where later generations have not yet been implemented. In some places, its successor 3G is being shut down rather than 2G – Vodafone previously announced that it had switched off 3G across Europe in 2020 but still retains 2G as a fallback service. In the US T-Mobile shut down their 3G services in 2022 while retaining their 2G GSM network until it was decommissioned on August 3, 2026.

Various carriers have made announcements that 2G technology in the United States, Japan, Australia, and other countries are in the process of being shut down, or have already shut down 2G services so that carriers can re-use the frequencies for newer technologies (e.g. 4G, 5G). In 2026, Brazil's Vivo also has announced that it will shut down their 2G services to focus exclusively on its 4G and 5G networks.

As a legacy protocol, 2G connectivity is considered insecure. Specifically, there exist well known methods to attack weaknesses in GSM since 2009 with practical use in crime. Attack routes on 2G CdmaOne were found later and remain less publicized.

Android 12 and later provide a network setting to disable 2G connectivity for the device. iOS 16 and later can disable 2G connectivity by enabling Lockdown Mode.

=== Criticism ===
In some parts of the world, including the United Kingdom, 2G remains widely used for older feature phones and for internet of things (IoT) devices such as smart meters, eCall systems and vehicle trackers to avoid the high patent licensing cost of newer technologies. Terminating 2G services could leave vulnerable people who rely on 2G infrastructure unable to communicate even with emergency contacts, causing harm and possibly deaths.

=== Past 2G networks ===
Country	Status	Network	Shutdown date	Standard	Notes
Åland	No Service	Ålcom	2025-02-03	GSM	
Anguilla		Digicel	active	GSM	900 MHz: 5 MHz GSM + 5 MHz UMTS; 1900 MHz: 5 MHz UMTS
Anguilla		FLOW	2024-04-22	GSM	
Antigua and Barbuda	No Service	APUA	2018-04-01	GSM	
Antigua and Barbuda	No Service	Digicel	2024-05-31	GSM	
Antigua and Barbuda	No Service	FLOW	2024-07-31	GSM	
Aruba	No Service	Digicel	2024-06-30	GSM	
Aruba	No Service	SETAR	2026-08-01	GSM	
Australia	No Service	Hutchison 3	2006-08-09	cdmaOne	
Australia	No Service	Optus	2017-08-01	GSM	2G shut down in WA and NT on 3 Apr 2017.
Australia	No Service	Telstra	2008-04-28	cdmaOne	
Australia	No Service	Telstra	2016-12-01	GSM	
Australia	No Service	Vodafone	2018-06-14	GSM	
Bahamas	No Service	BTC	2024-06-30	GSM	
Bahrain	No Service	Batelco	2021-11-30	GSM	
Barbados	partially unconfirmed	Digicel	2025-12-02	GSM	
Barbados	partially unconfirmed	FLOW	2024-04-22	GSM	
Belgium		Orange	2028-12-31	GSM	
Belgium		Telenet	2027	GSM	
Belgium		Proximus	2027	GSM	
Bermuda		Digicel	active	GSM	1900 MHz: 15 MHz GSM + 15 MHz LTE
Bermuda		One	active	GSM	1900 MHz: 5 MHz GSM + 20 MHz LTE
Bonaire	unconfirmed	Digicel	2025-03-31	GSM	
Bonaire	unconfirmed	FLOW	2024-04-22	GSM	
British Virgin Islands		CCT	active	GSM	1900 MHz: 10 MHz GSM + 20 MHz LTE
British Virgin Islands		Digicel	active	GSM	1900 MHz: 0.2 MHz GSM + 5 MHz UMTS + 10 MHz LTE
British Virgin Islands		FLOW	2024-04-22	GSM	
Brunei	No Service	UNN	2021-06-01	GSM	National Wholesale Network used by DSTCom, Progresif and imagine.
Canada		Bell	2019-04-30	cdmaOne	Shutdown of CDMA transmitters commenced in remote areas in 2017, followed by an official announcement in June 2018 that 2G devices will lose service soon.
Canada		Rogers Wireless	2027-11-30	GSM	1900 MHz shutdown in Jun 2021. 850 MHz remains active.
Canada		SaskTel	2017-07-31	cdmaOne	
Canada		Telus Mobility	2017-05-31	cdmaOne	
Cayman Islands	partially unconfirmed	Digicel	2020-07-01	GSM	
Cayman Islands	partially unconfirmed	FLOW	2024-04-22	GSM	
China		China Mobile	2026-12-31	GSM	900 MHz: 5 MHz GSM
China		China Telecom	2023-12-31	cdmaOne	CDMA2000 1xRTT, EV-DO Rev. A/B (3G) service also terminated. Shutdown commenced on 16 Jun 2020.
China		China Unicom	2022-12-31	GSM	Shutdown commenced on 18 Apr 2018. 910-915 MHz / 955-960 MHz: 5 MHz GSM or 4,2 MHz W-CDMA carrier with two 0,2 MHz GSM carriers on each side
Chile		Entel	2024-12-31 (est.)	GSM	Shutdown commenced on 11 Jul 2024.
Colombia	partially unconfirmed	Claro	active	GSM	Was supposed to shut down on February 2023, but the coverage shrinking stopped and the shutdown never happened. 824-849Mhz / 869-894Mhz 200Khz GSM per carrier (TDMA)
Colombia	partially unconfirmed	Tigo	2022-11-01	GSM	824-849Mhz / 869-894Mhz 200Khz per carrier (TDMA)
Curaçao	partially unconfirmed	Digicel	2025-03-31	GSM	
Curaçao	partially unconfirmed	FLOW	2024-02-29	GSM	
Dominica	partially unconfirmed	Digicel	2027-03-31	GSM	
Dominica	partially unconfirmed	FLOW	2024-03-??	GSM	
Finland		All operators	2030	GSM	GSM networks must be maintained until end of 2029.
France		Bouygues	2026-12-31	GSM	
France		Orange	2026-10-20	GSM	
France		SFR	2026-12-31	GSM	
Germany		Deutsche Telekom	2028-06-30	GSM	
Germany		Vodafone	2028-10-01 / 2030-12-31 (IoT)	GSM	
Germany		Telefónica (O_{2})	TBD	GSM	
Grenada	unconfirmed	Digicel	2024-03-31	GSM	
Grenada	unconfirmed	FLOW	2024-04-22	GSM	
Guam	unconfirmed	GTA Teleguam	TBD	GSM	
Hong Kong	No Service	3	2008-11-20	cdmaOne	Shut down due to license expiry. Government originally did not allow the license to be renewed due to unpopularity, however the government later reversed the decision and held an auction for CDMA2000 service, which PCCW-HKT won the auction and provided CDMA2000 service immediately after 3's license expiry.
Hong Kong	No Service	3	2021-09-30	GSM	
Hong Kong	No Service	CMHK	2026-06-23	GSM	
Hong Kong	No Service	CSL	2005	D-AMPS	Service previously provided by Pacific Link, which subsequently merged into CSL. Shut down due to license expiry. Government did not allow the license to be renewed due to unpopularity.
Hong Kong	No Service	CSL	2017-10-31	cdmaOne	Service previously provided by PCCW. After acquisition of CSL by HKT, its mobile business PCCW Mobile was merged into CSL. No service for local customers, only served incoming roaming tourists. CSL terminated its CDMA family business two years before its licence expiry, and CDMA2000 1xRTT, EV-DO Rev. A (3G) service has also terminated along with cdmaOne.
Hong Kong	No Service	CSL	2024-11-08	GSM	
Hong Kong	No Service	SmarTone	2022-10-14	GSM	
Iceland		Nova	2025-01-28	GSM	
Iceland		Síminn	2026-01-05	GSM	
Iceland		Sýn	2025-06-01	GSM	
Israel		Hot Mobile	2019-12-31	iDEN	
Israel			2025	GSM	Per government statement.
Jamaica	No Service	Digicel	2024-08-31	GSM	
Jamaica	No Service	FLOW	2024-04-15	GSM	
Japan	No Service	au KDDI	2012-07-22	cdmaOne	
Japan	No Service	NTT Docomo	2012-03-31	PDC	
Japan	No Service	Softbank	2010-03-31	PDC	
Jordan	No Service	Umniah	2021-03-11	GSM	
Macau	No Service	China Telecom	2010	cdmaOne	
Macau	No Service	CTM	2019-08-01	GSM	Service for local customers terminated on 4 Jun 2015, but remained for roaming users.
Macau	No Service	3	2019-08-01	GSM	Service for local customers terminated on 4 Jun 2015, but remained for roaming users.
Macau	No Service	SmarTone	2019-08-01	GSM	Service for local customers terminated on 4 Jun 2015, but remained for roaming users.
Mexico		AT&T	2016-09-30	cdmaOne	CDMA2000 service also terminated.
Mexico		AT&T	2019-09-01	GSM	Local shutdown commenced in Q1 2019.
Mexico		Movistar	2021-01-01	GSM	
Mexico		Telcel	active	GSM	GSM-1900
Montserrat	unconfirmed	Digicel	TBD	GSM	
Montserrat	unconfirmed	FLOW	2024-04-22	GSM	
Netherlands		KPN	2027-12-01	GSM	
Netherlands		T-Mobile	2021-06-01 / 2023-11-15 (IoT)	GSM	
New Caledonia		OPT-NC	2025	GSM	Shutdown commenced in 2022.
New Zealand	No Service	2degrees	2018-03-15	GSM	
New Zealand	No Service	One NZ	2026-03-23	GSM	
New Zealand	No Service	Spark	2012-07-31	cdmaOne	
Norway		Telenor	2027-12-31	GSM	
Norway		Telia	2025-12-02	GSM	Shutdown commenced in Aug 2025.
Panama	No Service	Digicel	2022-06-30	GSM	Complete shutdown of operations and market exit.
Panama	No Service	Tigo	2026-01-20	GSM	
Poland		Orange	2030-12-31	GSM	
Puerto Rico		Claro	2028-12-31	GSM	
Romania		Orange	2030-12-31	GSM	
Saint Kitts and Nevis		Digicel	2027-03-31	GSM	
Saint Kitts and Nevis		FLOW	2024-04-22	GSM	
Saint Lucia	unconfirmed	Digicel	2027-03-31	GSM	
Saint Lucia	unconfirmed	FLOW	2024-04-22	GSM	
Saint Vincent and the Grenadines		Digicel	2027-03-31	GSM	
Saint Vincent and the Grenadines		FLOW	2023-09-30	GSM	
Saudi Arabia		stc	2025 Q4	GSM	
Singapore	No Service	M1	2017-04-18	GSM	
Singapore	No Service	Singtel	2017-04-18	GSM	
Singapore	No Service	StarHub	2017-04-18	GSM	
Sint Maarten; Saba; Sint Eustatius	No Service	TelCell	2019-01-01	GSM	
Sint Maarten; Saba; Sint Eustatius	No Service	FLOW (UTS)	2017-09-26	GSM	
Slovakia		Orange	2030-12-31	GSM	
South Africa			TBD	GSM	Per government statement.
South Korea	No Service	KT	2012-03-19	cdmaOne	CDMA2000 1xRTT, EV-DO Rel. 0 (3G) service has also terminated.
South Korea	No Service	LG Uplus	2021-06-30	cdmaOne	CDMA2000 1xRTT, EV-DO Rev. A/B (3G) service has also terminated.
South Korea	No Service	SK Telecom	2020-07-27	cdmaOne	CDMA2000 1xRTT, EV-DO Rel. 0 (3G) service has also terminated.
Spain		Orange	2030-12-31	GSM	
Sweden		Net4Mobility (Telenor/Tele2)	2025-12-09	GSM	
Sweden		Telia	2027-12-31	GSM	
Switzerland	No Service	Salt	2020-12-31	GSM	Shutdown commenced on 1 Jul 2020. A few single 2G-only sites remained until Sep 2023 to preserve CSFB functionality.
Switzerland	No Service	Sunrise	2023-01-03	GSM	With the introduction of S-RAN in 2018 phaseout was previously postponed to 2022.
Switzerland	No Service	Swisscom	2021-04-07	GSM	Official shutdown on 31 Dec 2020 (guaranteed availability).
Taiwan	No Service	Chunghwa Telecom	2017-06-30	GSM	
Taiwan	No Service	FarEasTone	2017-06-30	GSM	
Taiwan	No Service	Taiwan Mobile	2017-06-30	GSM	
Trinidad and Tobago		Digicel	2025-12-31	GSM	
Trinidad and Tobago		bmobile (TSTT)	TBD	GSM	850 MHz: 2.5 MHz GSM + 5 MHz UMTS
Turks and Caicos Islands		Digicel	2025-06-30	GSM	900 MHz: 9.8 MHz GSM
Turks and Caicos Islands		FLOW	2024-04-22	GSM	
Ukraine		Kyivstar	active	GSM	In July 2026, Ukraine's regulator stated that shutting down 2G was not under consideration due to the Russian invasion.
Ukraine		Vodafone	active	GSM	In July 2026, Ukraine's regulator stated that shutting down 2G was not under consideration due to the Russian invasion.
Ukraine		Lifecell	active	GSM	In July 2026, Ukraine's regulator stated that shutting down 2G was not under consideration due to the Russian invasion.
United Arab Emirates	No Service	Du	2023-12-31	GSM	
United Arab Emirates	No Service	Etisalat	2023-12-31	GSM	
United Kingdom			2033	GSM	Per government statement on confirmation by mobile providers.
United States; US Virgin Islands	No Service	AT&T	2008-02-18	D-AMPS	TDMA (D-AMPS) on 1900 MHz shut down on 15 July 2007.
United States; US Virgin Islands	No Service	AT&T	2017-01-01	GSM	
United States; US Virgin Islands	No Service	Cellcom (US only)	2023-12-01	cdmaOne	CDMA2000 1xRTT, EV-DO Rev. A (3G) service has also terminated.
United States; US Virgin Islands	No Service	Commnet Wireless (Choice) (US only)	2022-12-31	cdmaOne	CDMA2000 1xRTT, EV-DO Rev. A (3G) service has also terminated.
United States; US Virgin Islands	No Service	Copper Valley Wireless	2022-09-30	cdmaOne	CDMA2000 1xRTT, EV-DO Rev. A (3G) service has also terminated.
United States; US Virgin Islands	No Service	Edge Wireless	2007-06-30	D-AMPS	
United States; US Virgin Islands	No Service	Inland Cellular	2025-09-03	cdmaOne	CDMA2000 1xRTT, EV-DO Rev. A (3G) service has also terminated.
United States; US Virgin Islands	No Service	T-Mobile	2026-08-03	GSM	Shutdown commenced on 03 Feb 2025 and was completed in most of the USA on 03 Aug 2026, with the final 2G tower in Sacramento, CA going offline on 04 Aug 2026.
United States; US Virgin Islands	No Service	T-Mobile (Sprint)	2022-05-31	cdmaOne	CDMA2000 1xRTT, EV-DO Rev. A (3G) service has also terminated. Shutdown commenced on 31 Mar 2022.
United States; US Virgin Islands	No Service	UScellular (US only)	2009–02	D-AMPS	
United States; US Virgin Islands	No Service	UScellular (US only)	2024-01-14	cdmaOne	CDMA2000 1xRTT, EV-DO Rev. A (3G) service has also terminated.
United States; US Virgin Islands	No Service	Verizon (US only)	2022-12-31	cdmaOne	CDMA2000 1xRTT, EV-DO Rev. A (3G) service has also terminated.
Venezuela		Digitel	2024-03-08	GSM	Shutdown commenced in May 2021.
Venezuela		Movilnet	2025	GSM	
Venezuela		Movistar	2025	GSM	Shutdown commenced on 1 Jul 2022.
Vietnam	No Service	Vietnammobile	2026-09-15	GSM	Services for 2G-only devices ceased to exist from Oct 2024. Fallback services maintained for 3G/4G devices that did not support VoLTE until the full switch-off (for Vietnam) on 15-16 Sep 2026. Only very limited 2G support remains in place for national security purposes.
Vietnam	No Service	Viettel	2026-09-15	GSM	Services for 2G-only devices ceased to exist from Oct 2024. Fallback services maintained for 3G/4G devices that did not support VoLTE until the full switch-off (for Vietnam) on 15-16 Sep 2026. Only very limited 2G support remains in place for national security purposes.
Vietnam	No Service	Vinaphone	2026-09-15	GSM	Services for 2G-only devices ceased to exist from Oct 2024. Fallback services maintained for 3G/4G devices that did not support VoLTE until the full switch-off (for Vietnam) on 15-16 Sep 2026. Only very limited 2G support remains in place for national security purposes.
Vietnam	No Service	Mobifone	2026-09-16	GSM	Services for 2G-only devices ceased to exist from Oct 2024. Fallback services maintained for 3G/4G devices that did not support VoLTE until the full switch-off (for Vietnam) on 15-16 Sep 2026. Only very limited 2G support remains in place for national security purposes.

== See also ==
- Cliff effect
- Dropout
- List of mobile phone generations
- Mobile radio telephone, also known as 0G
- 1G
- 3G
- 4G
- 5G
- 6G
- Wireless device radiation and health

Preceded by 1st Generation (1G)	Mobile Telephony Generations	Succeeded by 3rd Generation (3G)
