= Telia =

Telia may refer to:

- Telium, plural Telia, structure of the reproductive cycle of rusts (plant diseases)
- Telia Company, Swedish telecommunications company
  - Telia Digital-tv, Swedish TV platform
  - Telia Lietuva, Lithuanian telecommunications company
  - Telia Norge, Norwegian telecommunications company
  - Telia Eesti, Estonian telecommunications company
- Telia, India, village in India
- Telia, Nepal, village in Nepal
- Telia Challenge Waxholm, golf tournament
- Telia 5G -areena, football stadium in Helsinki, Finland.
