= Jesse Russell =

American inventor (born 1948)

Jesse Eugene Russell
- Born: April 26, 1948 (age 78); Nashville, Tennessee
- Education: B.S.E.E., Tennessee State University; M.S.E.E., Stanford University
- Occupation: Inventor
- Employer(s): incNETWORKS, Inc.
- Known for: Electrical Engineering; Digital Cellular Technology
- Title: Chief Executive Officer
- Spouse: Amanda O. Russell
- Children: Tina R. Carr; Jesse E. Russell Jr.; William E. W. Russell; Catalina M. Russell
- Parents: Charles Albert Russell; Mary Louise Russell

Jesse Eugene Russell (born April 26, 1948) is an American inventor. He was trained as an electrical engineer at Tennessee State University and Stanford University, and worked in the field of wireless communication for over 20 years. He holds patents and continues to invent and innovate in the emerging area of next generation broadband wireless networks, technologies and services, often referred to as 4G. Russell was inducted into the US National Academy of Engineering for his contributions to the field of wireless communication. He pioneered the field of digital cellular communication in the 1980s through the use of high power linear amplification and low bit rate voice encoding technologies and received a patent in 1992 for his work in the area of digital cellular base station design.

Russell is Chairman and CEO of incNETWORKS, Inc., a New Jersey–based Broadband Wireless Communications Company focused on 4th Generation (4G) Broadband Wireless Communications Technologies, Networks and Services.

== Early life and education ==
Jesse Eugene Russell was born April 26, 1948, in Nashville, Tennessee, in the United States of America into a large African-American family with eight brothers and two sisters. He is the son of Charles Albert Russell and Mary Louise Russell. His early childhood was spent in economically and socially deprived neighborhoods within the inner-city of Nashville. During his early years, he focused on athletics and not academics. Russell graduated from Cameron High School in 1967. A key turning point in Russell's life was the opportunity to attend a summer educational program at Fisk University in Nashville, Tennessee. Russell participated in this educational opportunity and began his academic and intellectual pursuits. Russell continued his education at Tennessee State University where he focused on electrical engineering. A Bachelor of Science Degree (BSEE) in Electrical Engineering was conferred in 1972 from Tennessee State University. As a top honor student in the School of Engineering, Russell became the first African American to be hired by AT&T Bell Laboratories directly from a Historically Black College or University (HBCUs) and subsequently became the first African-American in the United States to be selected as the Eta Kappa Nu Outstanding Young Electrical Engineer of the Year in 1980. Russell continued his academic pursuits and earned a Master of Electrical Engineering (MSEE) degree from Stanford University in 1973.

== Innovations and patents ==
Russell's innovations in wireless communication systems, architectures and technology related to radio access networks, end-user devices and in-building wireless communication systems have fundamentally changed the wireless communication industry. Russell is known for his invention of the digital cellular base station and the fibre optic microcell utilizing high power linear amplifier technology and digital modulation techniques.

Russell has over 100 patents granted or in process, such as these in the table.

Patent No.	Description
7,437,158	Advanced multi-network client device for wideband multimedia access to private and public wireless networks
7,120,139	Broadband cable telephony network architecture IP ITN network architecture reference model
5,724,665	Wireless communication base station
5,655,003	Wireless terminal having digital radio processing with automatic communication system selection capability
5,608,780	Wireless communication system having base units which extracts channel and setup information from nearby base units
5,257,397	Mobile data telephone
5,084,869	Base station for mobile radio telecommunications systems

In 1990, Russell, with fellow AT&T Bell Labs engineers Farhad Barzegar and Can A. Eryaman, filed a patent for a digital mobile phone that supports the transmission of digital data. Their patent was cited several years later by Nokia and Motorola when they were developing 2G digital mobile phones.

== Professional accomplishments ==
Russell joined Bell Labs as a Member of the Technical Staff. He was one of the first designers to use a microprocessor in the design of equipment for use in the telecommunication network for monitoring and tracking calling patterns within the Bell System Network. The system was referred to as the traffic data collection systems, which using microprocessor-based portable data terminals for interfacing to electromechanical switching systems.

Russell served in the following positions; Director of the AT&T Cellular Telecommunication Laboratory (Bell Labs), Vice President of Advanced Wireless Technology Laboratory (Bell Labs), Chief Technical Officer for the Network Wireless Systems Business Unit (Bell Labs), Chief Wireless Architect of AT&T, and Vice President of Advanced Communications Technologies for AT&T Laboratories (formerly a part of Bell Labs).

When he was the Director of the AT&T Cellular Telecommunication Laboratory, this Bell Labs Group was credited with the invention of cellular radio technology and received the United States' Medal of Technology for the invention.

Russell continued to develop his expertise as he established and led an Innovation Center focused on Applied Research in Advanced Communication Technologies that enabling AT&T to extend its existing portfolio of services and expand into new businesses and markets. As a key decision-maker in the selection and development of emerging communications technologies, Russell's efforts lead to the rapid realization of new access network platforms that enable AT&T to expand its broadband communication network options (i.e., Specialization: Cable Access Networks, DSL Access Networks, Power-line Carrier Access Networks, Fixed Wireless Access Networks, Satellite Access Networks and Broadband Wireless Communications Networks). The applications of these access technologies were one of the keys in expanding AT&T's interest in re-building it local access services business.

== Honors and recognition ==
- Elected as IEC Fellow for contributions in the development of Broadband Communications Access Technologies into the International Engineering Consortium (IEC), 1999.
- Inducted a member of the National Academy of Engineering (NAE) for technical contributions to, and leadership in, digital cellular communications technology, 1995.
- Elected to IEEE Fellow grade for technical leadership in the development of digital wireless communication concepts, technology, systems and standards, 1994.
- US Black Engineer of the Year for best Technical Contributions in Digital Cellular and Microcellular Technology, 1992, US Black Engineer Magazine.
- America's New Leadership Class Award 1985, Esquire Magazine.
- Outstanding Service Award 1983, Eta Kappa Nu.
- Outstanding Scientist Award 1982, National Society of Black Engineers.
- Eta Kappa Nu Outstanding Young Electrical Engineer of the Year, 1980.
- Scientist of the Year Award in 1980, National Technical Associations Inc.

== Publications ==
- "Universal Personal Communications: Emergence of a Paradigm Shift in the Communications Industry", International Journal of Wireless information Networks, Vol. 1, No. 3, 1994.
  This paper examines a major paradigm shift in the communications industry across four dimensions, analyzes the factors influencing the shift, articulates a vision of universal personal communications under the new paradigm and presents several service environment and transmission hierarchy models supporting the vision.
- "The US Evolution towards Personal Communications in the '90s" (with A. T. Kripalani), Proc. Pan European Digital Cellular Radio Conference, Rome, Italy, 1990.
  This paper proposes and describes a set of strategic technology platforms to assist the migration of the existing US cellular network to an all digital personal communications network.
- "AT&T Next Generation Digital Cellular Base Station Technology" (with R. W. Henn and R. S. Kerby), Proc. International Switching Symposium, Stockholm, Sweden, 1990.
  This paper describes the first all digital cellular base station system utilizing linear radio technology to support multiple radio air interface methods such as FDMA, TDMA and CDMA in a single system.
- "Design of Mobile Satellite System Architecture as an Integral Part of the Cellular Access Digital Network" (with E. S. K. Chien and J. A. Marinho), Proc. the Mobile Satellite Conference, Pasadena, 1988.
  This paper provides an overview of the interoperability aspects between digital cellular access networks and mobile satellite systems.
- "Emerging Cellular Access Digital Network" (with E. S. K. Chien and D. J. Goodman), Proc. World Telecommunication Forum, Americas Telecom, '88, Rio de Janeiro, Brazil, 1988.
  This paper describes the characteristics of an all digital cellular access network that supports integrated voice and data services (cellular ISDN). It is an expansion of the concepts put forth in publication 11 below.
- "Evolution Toward Digital Cellular Network in the U.S." (with E. S. K. Chien), Proc. 1988 Pan European Cellular Radio Conference, Amsterdam, Netherlands, 1988.
  This paper provides a vision for the migration of the existing US cellular network towards an all digital wireless access network.
- "A Systems Approach to Indoor Wireless Communication" (with E. S. K. Chien and D. J. Goodman), Proc. GLOBECOM '87, Tokyo, Japan, 1987.
  This paper describes an approach to in-building wireless communication and examines the interoperability with cellular mobile communication.
- "Cellular Access Digital Network (CADN) Wireless Access to Networks of the Future" (with E. S. K. Chien and D. J. Goodman), IEEE Communications Magazine, June 1987.
  This paper describes a scenario for the evolution of a digital cellular access network towards providing personalized wireless voice and data communication services.
- "Network Foundation for Providing Personal Communications", Proc. Digital Mobile Workshop on Personal Communications, Melbourne, Australia, 1987.
  This paper puts forth some original concepts, such as personal telephone numbers, logical network addressing and universal wireless access service protocols related to personal communications.
- "Cellular ISDN: New Interface for Wireless Access" (with E. S. K. Chien), Proc. International Conference on Communication Technology, Nanjing, China, 1987.
  This paper describes the benefits of mobile communications as an effective means to modernize the telecommunications infrastructure for China.
- "Cellular Access Digital Network" (with E. S. K. Chien), Proc. International Telecommunications Symposium, Taipei, Taiwan, 1987.
  This paper describes cellular integrated voice and data services access network (cellular ISDN) as a complement to the wire line ISDN.
- "Extension of ISDN Capability to Cellular Wireless Access" (with E. S. K. Chien and D. J. Goodman), Proc. Second Nordic Seminar on Digital Land Mobile Radio Communications, Stockholm, Sweden, 1986.
  This paper describes the original concept of an integrated voice and data services cellular access network (cellular ISDN) and establishes the important role of intelligent network in the cellular context.
