= Telenor Sverige =

Swedish telecommunications company

- Industry: Telecommunications
- Predecessor: Vodafone Sweden
- Founded: 1 April 1991 (as Europolitan); 2002 (as Vodafone Sweden); 31 October 2005 (as Telenor Sverige)
- Key people: Kaaren Hilsen (CEO Telenor Sverige)
- Products: Fixed line, mobile telephony and Broadband.
- Number of employees: 1900 (2017)
- Parent: Telenor
- Website: www.telenor.se

Telenor Sverige (previously Vodafone Sweden, Europolitan and Nordic Tel), is a mobile phone, IPTV and Internet service provider in Sweden, owned by Telenor. Telenor Sverige's network covers 99 percent of the country's population, with telecom infrastructure sharing on 2G, 4G LTE and 5G NR under the Net4Mobility joint venture with Tele2, and on 3G UMTS with 3 Sverige outside Stockholm, Gothenburg, Malmö, Lund and Karlskrona, where it has its own 3G masts. Today, Telenor Sweden has over 2.5 million mobile subscribers, approximately 645,000 broadband customers and half a million TV customers. Telenor Sweden has a turnover of approximately SEK 13.1 billion (2015) and has approximately 1,900 employees.

== History ==
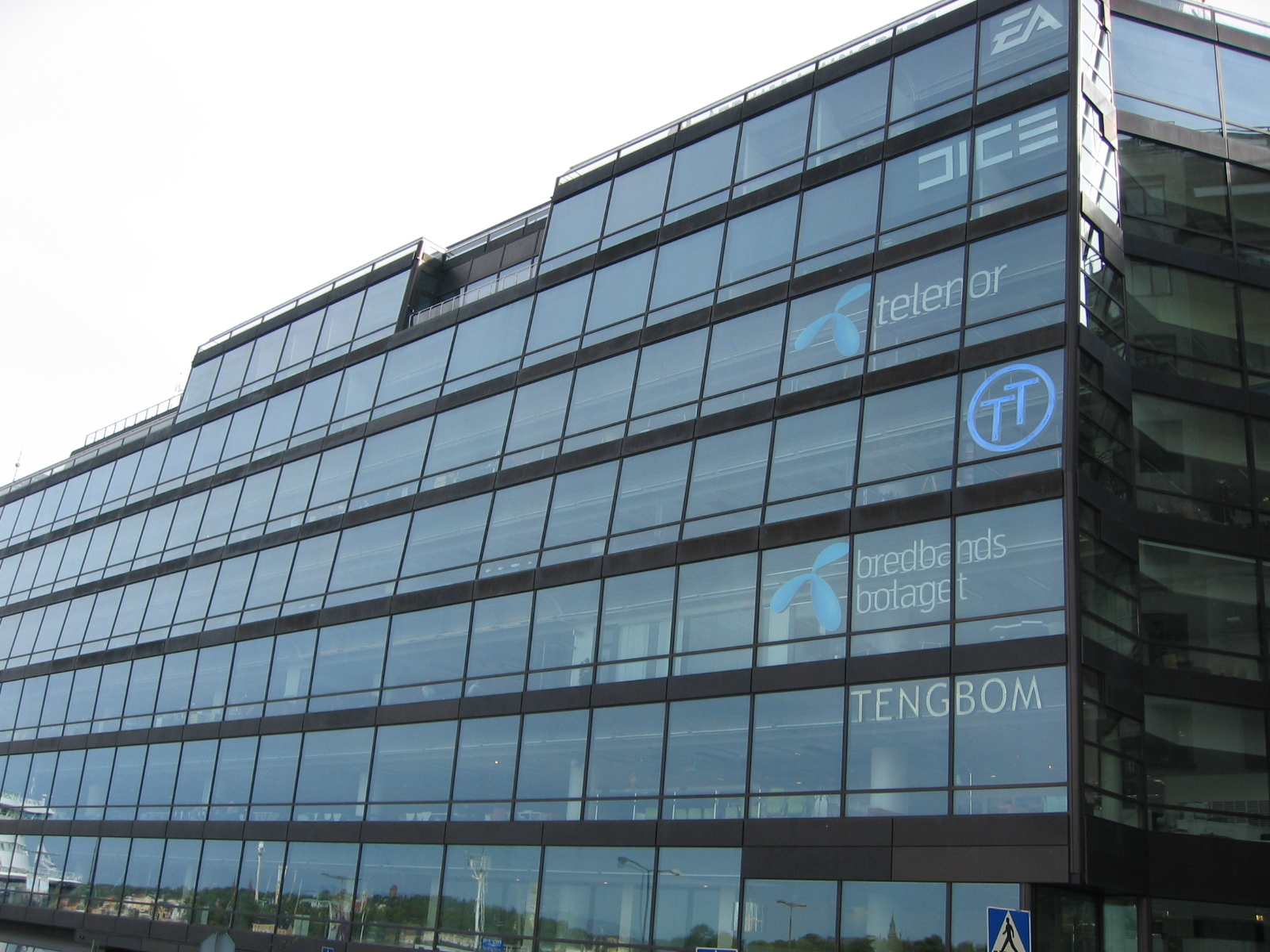
Telenor Sverige's former head office at KF-huset in Stadsgården, Stockholm

In September 1992, the network went live under the name Europolitan, owned by Nordic Tel. Europolitan was the first mobile phone network company in Sweden to launch SMS and voice mail. During the late 1990s, Vodafone Group went on an acquisition spree that led to the acquisition of Nordic Tel. In the early-2000s various operating companies in the Vodafone Group changed their names to Vodafone.

After several years of under-performance, Vodafone Sweden was sold on 31 October 2005 to Telenor, the largest telecommunications company in Norway, for approximately €1 billion. It took the Telenor name on 20 April 2006.

In 2014, Telenor Sverige launched the discount prepaid phone flanker brand Vimla, meant to compete against Comviq, Halebop and Hallon, discount prepaid brands owned by Tele2, Telia and 3 Sverige respectively.

On 15 May 2018 the daughter company Bredbandsbolaget merged into Telenor Sweden.

In 2025, Telenor started negotiations to acquire Swedish branch of mobile phone network Tre.
