= Chess Communication =

Norwegian telecommunications company

Chess Communication AS
- Company type: Subsidiary
- Industry: Telecommunications
- Founded: 1999
- Founder: A-Pressen
- Defunct: 2011 (as a company); 2018 (brand)
- Headquarters: Bergen, Norway
- Area served: Norway
- Revenue: NOK 985 million (2010)
- Operating income: NOK 25 thousand (2010)
- Net income: NOK 20 thousand (2010)
- Number of employees: 50 (2011)
- Parent: Telia Company
- Website: www.chess.no

Chess Communication was a Norwegian mobile virtual network operator (MVNO). Owned by Telia Company it uses its sister company Telia Norge's (formerly NetCom) network.

== History ==
The company was founded by A-Pressen in 1999 but sold to Idar Vollvik in 2002. He merged the company with the operator Sense that was owned by Reitangruppen, who also received a partial ownership in Chess. In 2006 Vollvik sold Chess to the Swedish multinational TeliaSonera for NOK 1.6 billion. The largest loser in the deal was Telenor who lost an estimated NOK 600–800 million per year in income because Chess moved their customers from the Telenor network to the TeliaSonera owned NetCom network. The company was deleted from the Register of Business Enterprises on 11 November 2011 after its merger with Telia Company, and continued as a discount brand from then until June 2018, when Telia closed down the brand and migrated all customers to the Telia network.
