= Elte =

Elte can refer to the following:

- Elte (river), a river of Germany
- Elte, North Rhine-Westphalia, former township now integrated into Rheine, Germany
- Eötvös Loránd University (Hungarian: Eötvös Loránd Tudományegyetem), a university in Budapest

== People with the surname ==
- Emanuel Lodewijk Elte (1881–1943), Dutch mathematician
- Harry Elte (1880–1944), Dutch architect

== See also ==
- Huawei 4G eLTE
