= Teo LT =

Lithuanian telecommunications company

TEO LT, AB
- Type: Public
- Traded as: Nasdaq Baltic: TEO1L
- Industry: Telecommunications
- Founded: 1992; 34 years ago
- Headquarters: Vilnius, Lithuania
- Area served: Lithuania
- Key people: Kęstutis Šliužas (CEO)
- Products: Fixed-line communications, digital terrestrial television, IPTV, Internet services, FTTH
- Revenue: 215 million EUR (2013)
- Website: www.telia.lt/en

Teo LT, AB was the largest Lithuanian broadband Internet access and voice telephony services operator, providing integrated telecommunication, IT, and TV services to residents and business. In 2017, the company became part of Telia Company.

== Overview ==
TEO had more than 640,000 main lines in services, more than 370,000 broadband internet connections, more than 150,000 television service users and more than 3,000 employees.

TEO Group was a part of Telia Company Group, which provides telecommunication services in the Nordic and Baltic countries, the emerging markets of Eurasia, including Russia and Turkey.

Having started its operations as a state enterprise in 1992 as Lietuvos Telekomas, in 1998, the company was privatised by a consortium of Swedish Telia AB and Finnish Sonera Oy, Amber Teleholding A/S. The consortium acquired 60% of the company's shares. At the time of merger, Telia Company owned more than 88% of the shares. TEO LT, AB shares were traded on NASDAQ OMX Vilnius stock exchange.

Since 2006, TEO had been providing digital interactive television services, based on IP technology (IPTV), and digital terrestrial television services since 2008.

In 2016, the number of TEO broadband Internet accesses increased by 3.4 percent, and reached 404 thousand at the end of the year. Of these, the number of fiber optic Internet accesses grew by 9.3 percent, and reached 246 thousand at the end of the year.

On 1 February 2017, Teo merged with Omnitel and Baltic Data Center and renamed in Telia Lietuva. Teo Omnitel has acquired shares for €220 million. After Telia Lietuva, Teo, Omnitel and Baltic Data Center, the company has become the most telecommunications, IT and TV service company in Lithuania. The merged company was called Telia Lietuva.

Telia Lietuva First 2017, the quarter revenue increased by 3.3% to 85.3 million compared to the same period in 2016. In December 2017, Telia Lithuania, Bitė Lietuva and Tele2 divided the shares of UAB Mobilieji Mokejimai equally (33.3 percent each).
