= Fighter brand =

Financial terminology

In marketing, a fighter brand (sometimes called a fighting brand or a flanker brand) is a lower-priced offering launched by a company to take on, and ideally take out, specific competitors that are attempting to under-price them. Unlike traditional brands that are designed with target consumers in mind, fighter brands are created specifically to combat a competitor that is threatening to take market share away from a company's main brand.

A related concept is the flanker brand, a term often found in the mobile phone industry and elsewhere. In the case of flankers, or multibranding, the products may be identical to the main offerings and the new brand is used to expand product placement.

== Concept ==
Use of a fighter brand is one of the oldest strategies in branding, tracing its history to cigarette marketing in the 19th century. The strategy is most often used in difficult economic times. As customers trade down to lower-priced offers because of economic constraints, many managers at mid-tier and premium brands are faced with a classic strategic conundrum: should they tackle the threat head-on and reduce existing prices, knowing it will reduce profits and potentially commodify the brand, or should they maintain prices, hope for better times to return, and in the meantime lose customers who might never come back. With both alternatives often equally unpalatable, many companies choose the third option of launching a fighter brand.

When the strategy works, a fighter brand not only defeats a low-priced competitor, but also opens up a new market. The Celeron microprocessor is a case study of a successful fighter brand. Despite the success of its Pentium processors, Intel faced a major threat from less costly processors that were better placed to serve the emerging market for low-cost personal computers, such as the AMD K6. Intel wanted to protect the brand equity and price premium of its Pentium chips, but also wanted to avoid AMD gaining a foothold into the lower end of the market. This led to Intel's creation of the Celeron brand, a cheaper, less powerful version of Intel's Pentium chips, as a fighter brand to serve this market.

== Examples ==
- Australia: Qantas launching Jetstar to take on Virgin Blue. Telstra, Optus and Vodafone respectively launching Belong, Gomo and Felix Mobile to take on MVNOs such as Aldi Mobile, Amaysim, Boost Mobile and TPG Mobile.
- Canada: Rogers Communications and Telus Mobility respectively launching Chatr and Koodo Mobile/Public Mobile to take on Mobilicity and Wind Mobile. Shaw Communications and Vidéotron respectively launching Shaw Mobile and Fizz Mobile to take on Bell Mobility's Lucky Mobile.
- France: Orange, SFR and Bouygues Telecom launching Sosh, Red by SFR and B&You to take on Free Mobile.
- Ireland: eir launching GoMo to take on An Post Mobile (formerly Postfone, MVNO using Vodafone towers), 48 Mobile and Tesco Mobile (MVNOs using Three towers).
- Italy: TIM, Vodafone and Wind Tre respectively launching Kena Mobile (formerly Nòverca), ho-mobile and Very Mobile to take on Iliad.
- Germany: Merck Sharp & Dohme launching Zocor MSD to take on generic brands and protect Zocor in Europe. Deutsche Telekom, Vodafone and O_{2} respectively launching Congstar, Otelo and Blau Mobilfunk initially as budget-focused counterparts of their regular mobile phone offerings, and later repositioned somewhat to take on 1&1 Drillisch.
- Philippines: Globe Telecom launching GOMO to take on Dito Telecommunity with comparable data offerings.
- Russia: Philip Morris launching Bond Street to take on local brands and protect Marlboro.
- Singapore: Singapore Airlines launching Scoot as an eventual successor to Tigerair to take on AirAsia and Jetstar Asia. Singtel and StarHub launching GOMO and Giga to take on Circles.Life and TPG Telecom.
- Sweden: Telia, Tele2, Telenor and 3 respectively launching Halebop, Comviq, Vimla and Hallon as lower-cost, prepaid and no binding contract counterparts of their regular mobile phone offerings.
- Switzerland: Swisscom, Sunrise and Salt Mobile respectively launching Wingo, yallo and swype, and GoMo as hybrid-prepaid and lower-cost counterparts of their regular mobile phone offerings.
- UK: British Airways launching Go to take on Ryanair and EasyJet. Tesco creating Jack's to counter growing competition from low-cost German supermarket chains Aldi and LIDL. Vodafone launching VOXI to take on O_{2}'s Giffgaff, Three's SMARTY and EE's BT and Plusnet.
- USA: General Motors launching Saturn to take on Japanese imports into America. Whole Foods launching 365 to take on lower-priced grocery stores such as Trader Joe's and Sprouts.
