= Göran Marby =

Swedish businessman

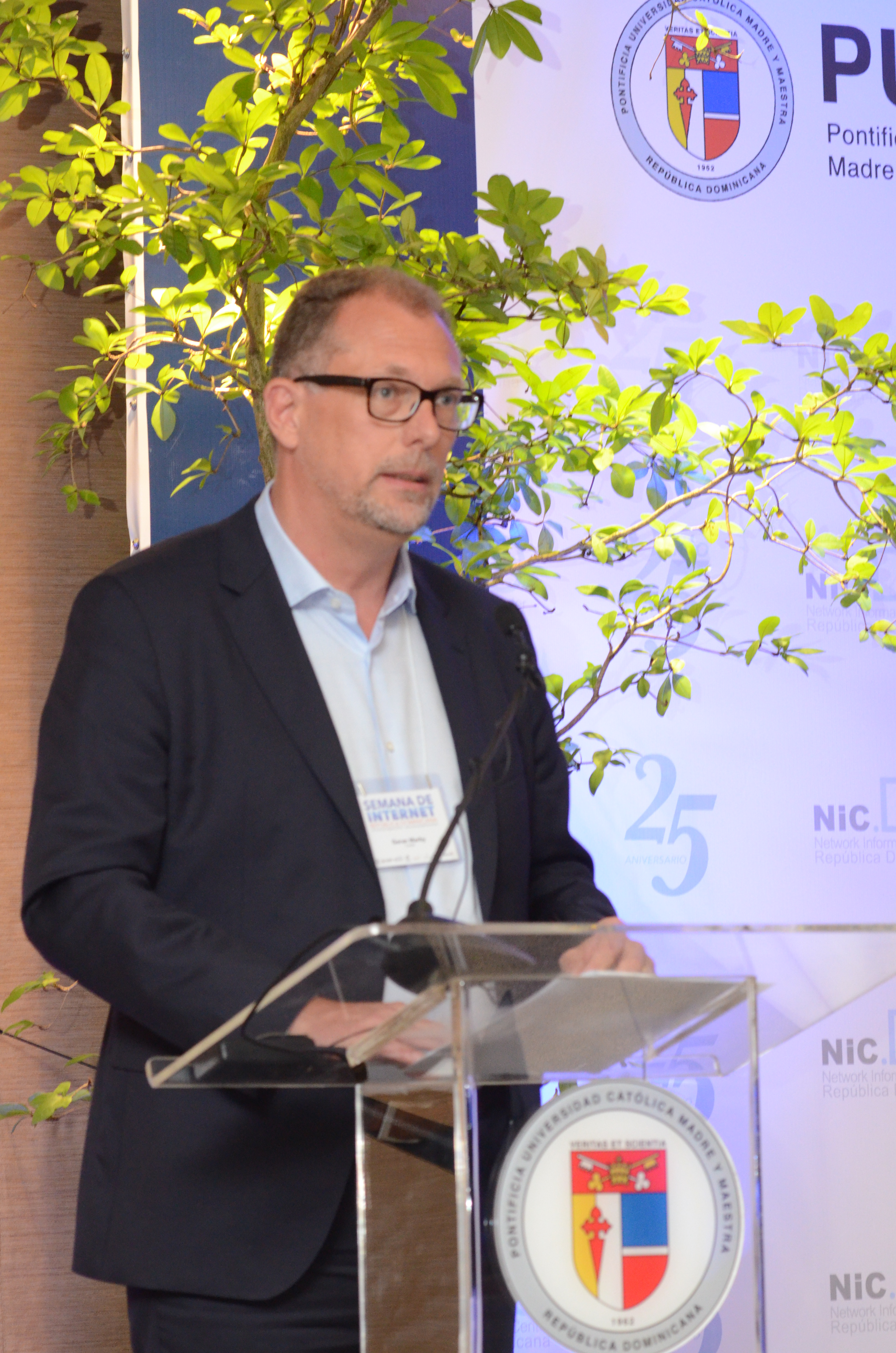
- Born: Bo Göran Edward Marby; March 22, 1963 (age 63); Gothenburg, Sweden
- Occupation: Business executive
- Website: Official profile

Bo Göran Edward Marby (March 22, 1963) is a Swedish businessman who was the CEO and President of the Internet Corporation for Assigned Names and Numbers (ICANN) from May 2016 to December 2022, a non-profit corporation based in California.

== Early life ==
Marby is from Sweden. He received a Bachelor of Science in finance from the University of Gothenburg (School of Business, Economics and Law).

== Career ==
Marby has been the Director-General of the Swedish Post and Telecom Authority (PTS). Earlier he co-founded AppGate Network Security AB, a security software company. He has also worked as CEO of Cygate (a network services company), Country Manager for Cisco in Sweden, and as CEO of Unisource Business Networks in Sweden.

=== Head of ICANN ===
He was CEO and President of ICANN between May 2016 and Dec 21, 2022 when he resigned.

In September 2016, he testified at a US Senate subcommittee meeting in support of the so-called "IANA transition", whereby oversight of ICANN would pass from the US government to the multi-stakeholder ICANN community.

== Personal life ==
Marby is married and has three children. He lives in Los Angeles.
