= Tele2 =

Multinational telecommunications company

Tele2 AB
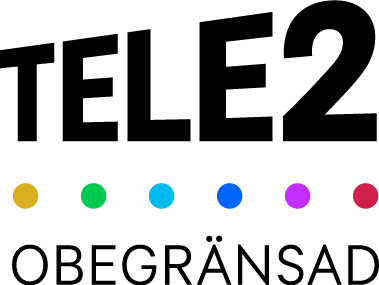
- Type: Public
- Traded as: Nasdaq Stockholm: TEL2 A TEL2 B
- ISIN: SE0005190238
- Industry: Telecommunications
- Founded: 1993; 33 years ago
- Founder: Jan Stenbeck
- Headquarters: Stockholm, Sweden
- Area served: Sweden, Estonia, Latvia, Lithuania
- Key people: Thomas Reynaud (Chairman); Nicholas Högberg (CEO)
- Products: Mobile and fixed telephony, broadband, data network services, TV, streaming and Internet of Things
- Revenue: 29,583 million kr (2024)
- Operating income: 5,817 million kr (2024)
- Net income: 3,870 million kr (2024)
- Total assets: 64,442 million kr (2024)
- Total equity: 22,097 million kr (2024)
- Owner: Iliad (via Freya Investissement): 24.58% of capital, 26.83% of votes
- Number of employees: 4,328 (2024)
- ASN: 1257
- Peering policy: Selective
- Traffic Levels: 1 Tbps+
- Website: tele2.com

Tele2 AB is a provider of mobile and fixed connectivity, telephony, data network services, TV, streaming and global Internet of things services, to consumers and enterprises. It is headquartered in Kista Science City, Stockholm, Sweden. It is a major mobile network operator in Sweden, Estonia, Latvia and Lithuania.

Tele2 was founded in 1993 by Investment AB Kinnevik, the investment company controlled by Jan Stenbeck, to challenge the state-owned incumbent Televerket. After expanding into more than twenty countries in the late 1990s and 2000s, including Russia, France and the Netherlands, it withdrew from most of them from 2006 onwards and refocused on Sweden and the Baltic states. In 2018 it merged with the Swedish cable operator Com Hem.

In 2024 Kinnevik sold its entire stake to Freya Investissement, an investment vehicle then jointly controlled by the French telecoms group Iliad and Xavier Niel's holding company NJJ Holding. Freya is now held by Iliad alone and is Tele2's largest shareholder, with about a quarter of the capital and of the votes.

== History ==
=== Origins (1981–1993) ===
Tele2's roots go back to 1981, when Jan Stenbeck's Kinnevik launched Comvik as an alternative mobile phone operator to the state-owned Televerket (today Telia Company). The cable television provider Kabelvision AB started in 1986. Comvik became Comviq when it obtained a GSM licence in 1988, and started its digital network in 1992. In 1991, Kinnevik launched Swipnet (AS1257), the first commercial internet service provider in Sweden, which was later folded into Tele2.

=== Founding and international expansion (1993–2005) ===
Tele2 made its first commercial call in March 1993, taking advantage of the liberalisation of the Swedish telephony market to offer international calls. It reached a market share of about 10% by the end of that year and began offering domestic calls in 1994; according to the company, call charges in Sweden were halved within three years. Tele2 was listed on the Stockholm Stock Exchange in 1996. In 1997, Comviq, Kabelvision and Tele2 were brought together, with Tele2 as the brand for fixed-line services and Comviq for mobile services, and the group introduced Sweden's first prepaid cards. In 2001, the parent company NetCom AB changed its name to Tele2 AB.

From the late 1990s the group expanded rapidly across Europe, generally as an alternative fixed-line operator or a mobile virtual network operator, with operations in countries including Denmark, Austria, France, Italy, the Baltic states and the United Kingdom. In 2001 it entered Russia by acquiring twelve regional mobile operators from its sister company Millicom, and built the country's fourth-largest mobile operator. In Sweden, Tele2 says it built the world's first 3G network in 2000 and, with Telenor, expanded 4G from 2010.

=== Refocusing (2006–2023) ===
From 2006 Tele2 sold most of its Western European operations (see Divestments) and, in 2013, its Russian business. In June 2016, it acquired the B2B services provider TDC Sweden from the Danish TDC Group.

In January 2018, Tele2 agreed to merge with the Swedish cable operator Com Hem, in which Kinnevik was also a shareholder. The deal valued Com Hem at about US$3.3 billion; Com Hem's shareholders received 26.9% of the combined company and SEK 6.6 billion in cash, and Kinnevik ended up with 27.3% of the capital and 41.9% of the votes. Com Hem's chief executive Anders Nilsson took over the combined group, succeeding Allison Kirkby. The merger was completed in November 2018, and the Com Hem brand was folded into Tele2 in 2021. The streaming service Comhem Play+, launched at the beginning of 2020 for non-customers too, was renamed Tele2 Play in January 2022.

In 2022, Tele2 became the first company in the Nordics and Baltics to have a science-based net-zero target approved by the Science Based Targets initiative. According to the company, it was named Europe's leading climate leader by the Financial Times in 2023 and Sweden's most sustainable company by Time in 2024.

=== Iliad as main shareholder (since 2024) ===
On 26 February 2024, Kinnevik, Tele2's main shareholder since its founding, agreed to sell its entire stake to Freya Investissement for SEK 13 billion, or SEK 93 per class B share and SEK 101 per class A share, a 13% premium to the market price. Freya acquired 19.8% of the capital, and Kinnevik said the sale was part of its refocusing on growth investments. Thomas Reynaud, chief executive of Iliad, became chairman of Tele2's board.

In September 2024, chief executive Kjell Johnsen announced his departure. He was succeeded on 10 November 2024 by Jean-Marc Harion, previously chief executive of Iliad's Polish subsidiary Play. Under Harion, Tele2 launched a cost and complexity reduction programme that cut about 650 positions by the end of 2025. For that year it reported underlying EBITDAaL of SEK 11.7 billion, up 11% organically, end-user service revenue of SEK 22.1 billion, up 2%, and a 42% increase in equity free cash flow, and proposed a dividend of SEK 10.50 per share.

In February 2026, Freya, which then held about 19% of the capital but 27% of the votes, said it would raise its economic interest up to the level of its voting rights, including through swap arrangements. Harion stepped down for personal reasons on 30 June 2026, while remaining on the board, and was succeeded on 1 July by his deputy Nicholas Högberg, previously chief commercial officer for the consumer business.

== Ownership ==
Tele2's largest shareholder is the French telecoms group Iliad, through its subsidiary Freya Investissement. As of 9 November 2026, Freya held 24.58% of the capital and 26.83% of the votes, plus a 0.64% exposure through derivatives. The other main shareholders are institutional investors:

Shareholder	Capital	Votes
Iliad (via Freya Investissement)	24.58%	26.83%
BlackRock	7.86%	7.43%
Vanguard	3.74%	3.54%
Handelsbanken Fonder	2.46%	2.33%
Norges Bank Investment Management	1.69%	1.55%
Folksam	1.63%	1.54%
Swedbank Robur Fonder	1.11%	1.05%

== Divestments ==
Countries where Tele2 operates. Countries where Tele2 no longer operates.

Today, Tele2 operates in Sweden and the Baltic countries Estonia, Latvia, and Lithuania.

Tele2 has terminated operations, activities, and holdings in the following countries: Austria, Belgium, Croatia, Denmark, Finland, France, Germany, Italy, Kazakhstan, Liechtenstein, Luxembourg, Netherlands, Norway, Portugal, Poland, Russia, Switzerland, and the United Kingdom.

In 2007 the company sold its holdings in Belgium to Dutch operator KPN, in France to SFR and activities in Spain and Italy to Vodafone Italy, in Portugal to Clix and in Switzerland to TDC Sunrise. In March 2008 Tele2 divested its Austrian MVNO operations to Telekom Austria, although retaining its fixed line and internet services until the latter two services were sold to Hutchison 3 in 2017. In June 2008 Tele2 sold its Liechtenstein and Luxembourg holdings to Belgian operator Belgacom. The same month Tele2 sold its Polish operations to Netia.

Tele2 reportedly attempted to sell its German unit as well in 2007, eventually the sale came through a management buyout in 2020. The newly formed company trades as STROTH Telecom GmbH.

In 2005 they sold their UK & Ireland fixed operations to Carphone Warehouse for £8.7m. They also pulled out of the Finnish market stating problems with the competitive and regulatory environment after the Finnish government had previously cancelled their 3G licence, due to not completing a network in time.

In 2021 the company agreed to sell its stake in T-Mobile Netherlands, together with Deutsche Telekom; the sale was completed in 2022.

== Operations ==
=== Europe ===
==== Austria ====
Tele2 operated in Austria from 1999 to 2007 and does not operate there now. The Tele2 operations started as an alternative fixed-line telephone operator. ADSL internet services were introduced in 2003. One Year later, Tele2 Austria bought UTA Telekom AG, a former competitor, and became the largest provider for alternative telecommunication service in Austria. In addition to fixed-line services, Tele2 Austria used their infrastructure for carrier services.

In March 2008 Tele2 divested its Austrian MVNO operations to Telekom Austria, although retaining its fixed line and internet services until the latter two services were sold in 2017 (28.7.2017) to Hutchison Drei Austria, the third largest mobile operator in Austria.

==== Croatia ====
Tele2 operated in Croatia from 2005 to 2019 and does not operate there now. In Croatia, Tele2 operated a 3G network at 42.2 Mbit/s, same as competitors but at a much wider area, nearly every area covered in standard 3G has access to this 3.75G technology. It also operated a 4G network at up to 150 Mbit/s. As of October 2015, it has 885,542 customers. In 2015 revenue was 83.72 million euros. On 1 February 2016 Tele2 Croatia started its 4G LTE network. It covers every major city and its surroundings, as well as many rural areas. According to Tele2 Croatia, their 4G network covers 90% of Croatia's population, while their 3G network covers 99% of Croatia's population.

In July 2019 it was sold for 220 million euros to United Group. On 3 November 2020, United Group changed the name to Telemach.

==== Denmark ====
In May 2007 Telenor announced that the company would be acquiring Tele2 Denmark for DKK 835 million. Tele2 had been operating in Denmark since 1996.

==== Estonia ====
Tele2 is operating a HSPA-enabled 3G network in the 900 MHz and 2100 MHz bands as well as a 2G GSM network in the 900 MHz and 1800 MHz bands in Estonia.

Tele2 commercially launched its 4G LTE network in the 1800 MHz and 2.6 GHz bands in November 2012. The 800 MHz LTE band was added in May 2014 and 2100 MHz in July 2015. Tele2 claimed an LTE population coverage of 90% in September 2015.

In 2022, Tele2 acquired spectrum in the 3410–3800 MHz band as part of a licence to provide 5G services, and began offering 5G in Tallinn the same year.

==== France ====
Tele2 operated in France from 1999 to 2009 and does not operate there now. Tele2 used to operate a 2G MVNO in France using Orange network for coverage and joined Virgin Mobile in 2009. They also used to operate alternative fixed line & internet services which they sold to Vivendi unit SFR for €350 million in 2007.

==== Germany ====
Tele2 exited the German market in 2020 and does not operate there now. Tele2 provided fixed broadband via ADSL as well as fixed telephony. In July 2013, Tele2 launched mobile voice plans on the E-Plus (now O2 Germany) network. In December 2020 the unit was sold by a Management buyout with the Trademark Tele2 for Germany. The new company continues to use the old brand as "Tele2 Deutschland".

==== Italy ====
Tele2 operated in Italy from 1999 to 2007 and does not operate there now. In 2005 it began to offer ADSL in large cities including Milan and Rome in unbundling, and then quickly extended the service to numerous other areas of Italy.In 2007 it added a P2P traffic filtering function to its ADSL service.

In 2007 the company was acquired by Vodafone. No longer being linked to Tele2, in 2010 "Tele2 Italia" changed its name into "TeleTu".

==== Latvia ====
Tele2 entered the Latvian market in 2000 and now operates as one of the largest nationwide Mobile Network Operator in Latvia, including 5G services in the 3.6 GHz, and 700 MHz bands.

==== Lithuania ====
Tele2 Lithuanian headquarters in Vilnius, Lithuania

Tele2 operates a nationwide mobile network in Lithuania, including 5G services in the 700 MHz and 3.6 GHz bands. According to the company, Tele2 Lithuania moved from last place to market leader, and its 4G network covers 99% of the country. It was named the most transparent company in Lithuania by Transparency International Lithuania in 2017, and its chief executive Petras Masiulis was named CEO of the Year 2017 in Lithuania.

==== Netherlands ====
Tele2 operated in The Netherlands from 2005 to 2019 and does not operate there now. Tele2 operated as a 2G, 3G and 4G MVNO on the mobile network of T-Mobile NL and in the fourth quarter of 2015 launched the world's first 4G-only MNO in the Netherlands with nearly 850,000 customers in addition to fixed network triple play services, serving over one million customers in total.

Tele2 purchased Versatel in the Netherlands in mid-2005 which allowed it to move away from carrier select services via KPN and onto own infrastructure. The new Tele2 Netherlands offered a full suite of triple play services. On 15 July 2010, Tele2 demonstrated the first LTE network in the Netherlands on the frequencies 2600 MHz. In late 2010, Tele2 Netherlands acquired BBned from Telecom Italia.

The telecom regulator in the Netherlands, Agentschap Telecom, held a multiband auction which concluded on 14 December 2012. Tele2 was awarded 2x10 MHz in the 800 MHz band which together with its previous 2.6 GHz license will enable Tele2 to cost efficiently build a high capacity LTE network with national coverage. Tele2 paid €161M for its licenses which can be considered low, compared to the €1.3bn that KPN and Vodafone paid each for their frequencies and the €900M that T-Mobile will have to pay for theirs. The considerably lower price was a result of spectrum reservation set by the government for a new mobile entrant, with favourable acquisition, Tele2 will enable lower prices for customers and increase competition on the Dutch market.

€3.8 billion was raised in the auction, which is unprecedented for a country with a population of a mere 16 million. In 2015, the organisation launched a new mobile network. The scheme cost approximately $187 million and had been in development since 2014.

In 2019, Tele2 Netherlands merged with T-Mobile Netherlands. As part of the purchase, Tele2 AB acquired a 25% share in T-Mobile Netherlands. Tele2 agreed to sell its share in T-Mobile Netherlands in 2021, and the sale was completed in 2022.

In September 2023, T-Mobile and Tele2 have been rebranded to Odido.

==== Norway ====
Tele2 exited the Norwegian market in 2015 and does not operate there now. Tele2 Norway consisted of the brands Tele2, OneCall, MyCall and Network Norway. On 7 July 2014, it was announced that Tele2 would be acquired by Telia Company. On 5 February 2015, the deal was approved by Norwegian competition authorities.

==== Sweden ====
Sweden is where Tele2 originates from and it remains one of its strongest markets serving over 2 million private customers. When the Swedish Post and Telecom Authority awarded four licenses for the 3G UMTS mobile networks in December 2001, Tele2 was among the winners. Notably Telia, the former telephony incumbent in Sweden, did not receive a license and so an agreement was established to build a 3G network shared by Tele2 and Telia using Tele2's license. SUNAB builds, owns and operates that 3G network.

A similar company, Net4Mobility, was formed in 2009 between Tele2 and Telenor Sverige for the purpose of building a joint 4G LTE network. The 4G product was officially launched on 15 November 2010 and in 2023, Tele2's 4G network today covers 99.9% of the Swedish population. As the equipment used by Net4Mobility can serve both LTE and 2G, the new network built primarily for LTE will also replace the aging 2G networks of Tele2 and Telenor, providing lower cost through shared infrastructure. In addition, it enables EDGE, a service previously not available via Tele2.

On 24 May 2020, Tele2 became the first mobile network operator in Sweden to commercially launch a 5G NR network. By mid-2025, Tele2's 5G coverage was expected to reach 93% of the population, of which 75% with high-performance 5G+.

On 1 December 2025, Tele2 and Telenor began shutting down their 2G network through Net4Mobility. The phase-out coincided with the decommissioning of the 3G network, freeing spectrum for 4G and 5G, while older phones and connected devices relying only on 2G or 3G stopped working.

==== United Kingdom ====
Tele2 operated in The United Kingdom from 2003 to 2005 and does not operate there now. In 2005 Tele2 sold their UK & Ireland fixed operations to Carphone Warehouse for £8.7m.

=== Russia and CIS ===
==== Kazakhstan ====
Tele2 operated in Kazakhstan from 2005 to 2018 and does not operate there now.

51% of Mobile Telecom-Service LLP was purchased by Tele2 in early 2010 to serve as a base for the company's mobile services in Kazakhstan. Tele2 has an option to buy the remaining 49% of Mobile Telecom-Service LLP within 5 years after the contract was closed. Tele2 is the smallest of three mobile operators in Kazakhstan with about 4.3 million customers. In December 2018 Tele2 ended operations, leaving Beeline to be the only government-independent carrier.

==== Russia ====
Tele2 operated in Russia from 2001 to 2013 and does not operate there now. Tele2 started the operations in the Russian Federation by acquiring 12 regional mobile operators from its sister company Millicom in 2001, In 2013, Tele2 sold its Russian operations, which then had almost 23 million customers, to the state-controlled bank VTB for about US$2.4 billion plus $1.15 billion in net debt.

In February 2020, Rostelecom took full ownership of the former Tele2 Russia by acquiring VTB's remaining stake.

On 4 September 2024, the former Tele2 Russia rebranded and changed its name to "t2".

== See also ==
- List of mobile network operators in Europe
- List of Swedish television channels
- List of Swedish companies
