= GoMo =

Mobile telephone flanker brand

- Product type: Mobile telecommunications
- Current owner: Independent: Singtel subsidiaries (Singapore, Thailand, Philippines, Australia), Eir (Ireland), Salt Mobile (Switzerland), Epic Ltd. (Cyprus)
- Country: Operates in Singapore, Thailand, Philippines, Ireland, Switzerland, Cyprus
- Introduced: 2019
- Related brands: Singtel, Eir (telecommunications), Salt Mobile, Epic (Cyprus)
- Markets: Singapore, Thailand, Philippines, Ireland, Switzerland, Cyprus
- Website: Singapore; Thailand; Philippines; Ireland; Switzerland; Cyprus

GoMo (or GOMO) is the name of four independently operated, online-only mobile telephone flanker brands. Although they share the same name and digital-only business model, GoMo services are operated independently under different parent companies in various countries.

GoMo primarily offers SIM-only mobile services with online sign-up, app-based account management, and no in-person customer service. While the brand markets itself as digital-only, in some countries such as the Philippines, SIM cards are also distributed through physical retail outlets (e.g., convenience stores and malls).

== History and Market Presence ==
- GOMO Singapore was the first to launch, on 25 March 2019, using the Singtel mobile network.
- GOMO Thailand was launched in May 2020 and is operated by Advanced Info Service, a partly owned Singtel subsidiary. The service was marketed with a low-cost, app-based subscription model.
- GOMO Philippines launched on 1 October 2020, and is operated by Globe Telecom, another partly owned Singtel subsidiary. It became the country’s first fully digital telco and surpassed 1 million subscribers by 2021.
- GoMo Ireland was launched on 15 October 2019, using the Eir mobile network. It gained attention for its €9.99 unlimited plan and had over 250,000 customers by October 2020.
- GoMo Switzerland launched on 16 November 2021 using the Salt Mobile network. Like its Irish counterpart, it offered digital-only, low-cost SIM plans.
- GoMo Cyprus launched in November 2024 and is a trading name of Epic Ltd. Unlike the other GoMo brands, it is not affiliated with Singtel, Eir, nor Salt Mobile. GoMo Cyprus debuted with a €5.99/month promotional plan, later rising to €9.99/month.
- GOMO Australia was operated by Optus, a wholly owned subsidiary of Singtel. The service launched in 2020 but stopped accepting new customers on 1 June 2023, and all services officially ceased on 15 December 2023.

== Products and services ==
=== Singapore ===
GOMO Singapore provides contract-free SIM-only plans with varying data and roaming options. As of 2025, their popular plan includes:

- 300 GB of 5G+ data
- 800 local minutes and 800 SMS
- 10 GB of roaming data to selected destinations (e.g., Malaysia, Indonesia)

Plans are app-managed and start from S$14.33/month.

=== Thailand ===
GOMO Thailand, operated by AIS, offers digitally managed SIM-only plans such as:

- Unlimited data at speeds up to 10 Mbps
- Unlimited calls to other AIS numbers
- Monthly fee of THB 299

All sign-up and account management is via the GOMO Thailand mobile app.

=== Philippines ===
GOMO Philippines offers prepaid SIM-only plans with no expiry on data. Popular offers include:

- 30 GB of data for ₱399
- 25 GB with 100 minutes + 500 texts for ₱299

Users can convert data into call minutes or SMS using the app (“Mo Creds”).

The service is fully digital, with SIMs available online and in physical retail outlets.

=== Ireland ===
GoMo Ireland offers a single SIM-only postpaid mobile plan that includes:

- Unlimited calls to Irish mobiles and landlines
- Unlimited texts to Irish mobiles
- 120 GB of 4G/5G data (with unlimited lower-speed data thereafter)
- 10 GB of EU roaming data The service is managed entirely online via the GoMo website.

=== Switzerland ===
GoMo Switzerland offers a SIM-only plan with free activation fees that includes:

GoMo

- Unlimited local calls and SMS
- Unlimited domestic 4G/5G data
- Promotional price of SFr 9.95/month for the first 50,000 customers as of April 30, 2025 and SFr 12.95/month

GoMo+

- Unlimited local calls and SMS
- Unlimited domestic 4G/5G data + 5GB Europa

GoMo Europe

- Unlimited local calls and SMS
- Unlimited domestic + Europa 4G/5G data (20GB Highspeed)
- Price SFr 19.95/month

The service is provided by Salt and positioned as a budget digital offering.

=== Cyprus ===
GoMo Cyprus, operated by Epic Ltd., provides a single SIM-only plan that includes:

- Unlimited national calls and SMS
- Unlimited 5G mobile data, with a fair use limit of 100GB per month (after which speeds are reduced with no extra charge)
- 14 GB of EU/EEA roaming data, in line with the "Roam Like at Home" policy and GoMo’s fair usage policy
- Fixed monthly price of €9.99 (launched at €5.99 for early users)

Services are managed online via the GoMo portal; no physical support centers are offered.

== Customer service ==
GoMo does not provide customer support through phone lines or in-person service centers. Instead, all assistance is handled through digital channels such as live chat, email, mobile apps, and official social media platforms. This online-only support model is consistent with GoMo’s digital-first approach across all operating countries.
