= Tele2 UK Services =

Defunct British telecommunications company

Tele2 UK Services Limited
- Formerly: Browntrees Ltd.; (2000); Alpha Telecom Communications Ltd.; (2000-2005)
- Type: Limited Company
- Industry: Telecommunications
- Founded: 7 July 2000; 26 years ago
- Founder: Tele2
- Defunct: 19 December 2005; (as a brand); 13 October 2013; (as a legal entity)
- Fate: Acquired by Carphone Warehouse
- Successor: TalkTalk
- Headquarters: London, United Kingdom
- Products: Telephone company
- Parent: Carephone Warehouse

Tele2 UK Services was the United Kingdom and Republic of Ireland based operation of multinational telecommunications company Tele2. It was acquired by Carphone Warehouse for £8.5 million in 2005.

== History ==
On 7 July 2000, Browntrees Limited was incorporated with Companies House in the United Kingdom. A month later, on 8 August, it was renamed to Alpha Telecom Communications Limited. Alpha Telecom was acquired by multinational telecommunications company Tele2 in 2003, and begun marketing its services under the Tele2 brand by the end of the same year.

In December 2005, it was announced that Tele2 had pulled out from the British & Irish markets after selling its Tele2 UK subsidiary to Carphone Warehouse for £8.5 million. Following the completion of the acquisition, Tele2UK was integrated into Carphone Warehouse's TalkTalk brand. At the time of the acquisition, the company had 188,000 customers in the UK and 36,000 in the Republic of Ireland.
