= Huawei 4G eLTE =

4G eLTE is Huawei's proprietary derivative of the LTE standard, the "e" standing for "enhanced", intended to provide wireless broadband transmission with peak downlink speeds of 50 Mbit/s and 20 Mbit/s uplink per site in 5 MHz, 10 MHz and 15 MHz frequencies.

== See also ==
- Emergency operations center
- High Speed Packet Access and HSPA+
- Huawei SingleRAN
- Huawei Symantec – Joint venture between Huawei and Symantec
