= CTIL =

Radio mast infrastructure company in the United Kingdom

Cornerstone Telecommunications Infrastructure Limited (CTIL) is a British company that operates radio mast infrastructure. The company was formed in 2012 as a joint venture between the mobile phone operators Telefónica (trading as O2 in Britain) and Vodafone.

In 2019 it was reported that CTIL's owners were considering a "partial monetization" of CTIL's assets to finance their 5G network rollout.

== See also ==
- MBNL, a similar partnership between Three and EE
