= Huawei SingleRAN =

Huawei SingleRAN is a radio access network (RAN) technology offered by Huawei that allows mobile telecommunications operators to support multiple mobile communications standards and wireless telephone services on a single network. The technology incorporates a software-defined radio device, and is designed with a consolidated set of hardware components, allowing operators to purchase, operate and maintain a single telecommunications network and set of equipment, while supporting multiple mobile communications standards.

== History ==
Huawei began to develop its SingleRAN technology in order to address network operators' demand for improved cost efficiency in managing telecommunications network sites, spectrum, pipeline and staff. In 2008, the company introduced the industry's first commercial SingleRAN product, which allowed mobile operators to switch from GSM to UMTS network standards or use both simultaneously. That year Huawei also launched a commercial network based on SingleRAN that offered simultaneous CDMA and LTE modes.

=== Deployment ===
In May 2009, América Móvil, the largest mobile operator in Latin America, deployed Huawei's SingleRAN GSM and UMTS system in Panama, providing its customers with voice and data services from GSM and UMTS networks simultaneously. According to The Economist, América Móvil found that the power consumption of its base stations was reduced by 50% and the volume of equipment it needed was reduced by 70%, following deployment of Huawei's SingleRAN hardware.

In June 2009, Huawei's SingleRAN technology was selected by TeliaSonera for Europe's first GSM/UMTS network with software-defined radio (SDR) technology. TeliaSonera used Huawei SingleRAN to provide its subscribers in Finland with both GSM and UMTS services using the same 900MHz spectrum. Later that year, in December 2009, TeliaSonera also used Huawei's SingleRAN LTE technology to launch the world's first LTE commercial network in Norway. That same month, Net4Mobility selected Huawei SingleRAN GSM system to deploy their GSM/LTE 900 MHz SDR network in Sweden.

=== Developments ===
In March 2010, Huawei achieved what it stated is a world-record 1.2 Gbit/s download speed on a demo network built around Huawei's prototype SingleRAN LTE-Advanced device. In November that year, the company released a new SingleRAN technology, enabling operators to migrate between WiMAX and LTE TDD networks. That same month, Aero2 selected Huawei's SingleRAN technology to deploy the world's first GSM and LTE 1800MHz SDR network in Poland, which was due to become operational in early 2011.

In the first half of 2011, Huawei launched a SingleRAN system that supported both WiMAX and LTE. To date, Huawei has deployed over 130 SingleRAN networks worldwide for global network operators including Telefónica, O2 Germany, China Unicom, America Movil, Telenor, Net4Mobility and TeliaSonera.

== Products ==
Huawei has developed and provides four SingleRAN products for mobile network operators. According to Huawei, SingleRAN GSM is designed for mobile operators using GSM networks, allowing them to simultaneously offer GSM with UMTS or LTE. The product also aims to prepare operators for future evolution of technology, including moving to mobile broadband networks. Huawei's SingleRAN LTE allows mobile service operators to migrate to LTE networks, and also continue to offer GSM, EDGE, UMTS or HSPA. The technology provides download speeds of up to 100 Mbit/s. The SingleRAN@Broad system was launched by Huawei at the Mobile World Congress in Barcelona in February 2010. This product helps operators to accommodate large increases in mobile broadband traffic and reduce the per-bit costs of network operation. According to Huawei, SingleRAN@Broad is capable of increasing operators’ mobile broadband capacity to handle high traffic generated by smartphones and similar devices. In November 2010, Huawei released SingleRAN WiMAX/LTE TDD, which allows operators to migrate from WiMAX to LTE TDD networks by configuring the technology as either a WiMAX module, a LTE TDD module, or a dual-mode module.

In addition to the SingleRAN products for mobile telecommunications operators, Huawei also offers a SingleRAN product aimed at railway transport systems. SingleRAN GSM-R is a suite of communications technologies that are designed to improve telecommunications performance through long tunnels, over very long distances, and in high-traffic areas. Huawei began researching GSM-R technologies in 2001 and, according to Cellular News, is "one of only a few" GSM-R network providers in the world.

== Awards ==
In September 2009, Huawei's SingleRAN Dual-Mode Remote Radio Unit 3808 won an InfoVision award in the category of “New Product Concepts” from the International Engineering Consortium (IEC) at the Broadband World Forum in Paris. The following year, at the Broadband World Forum in October 2010, Huawei's SingleRAN@Broad technology was awarded the 2010 InfoVision Award in the category of “Broadband Access Network Technologies and Services”. In May 2011, Huawei's SingleRAN 5-Band 3-Mode 1-Cabinet technology (BTS 3900L) won the “Best LTE Network Elements” award at the LTE World Summit. In June 2011, Huawei won a 2011 CDMA Development Group (CDG) Industry Achievement Award for its SingleRAN CDMA/LTE technology in the category of “Innovation in Network Technology and Mobile Applications.”
