= SUNAB =

Svenska UMTS-Nät AB
- Industry: Telecommunications
- Founded: 2001
- Headquarters: Stockholm, Sweden
- Area served: Sweden
- Products: mobile network operator
- Website: www.svenskaumts.se

SUNAB, Svenska UMTS-nät AB, was a company jointly owned by Tele2 Sverige AB and Telia Company AB for the purpose of building, owning and operating a 3G network for the parent companies. SUNAB was formed in 2001.

The joint network operated by SUNAB was the largest 3G network in Sweden, both by coverage and customer base, and is currently being decommissioned until 2025.

SUNAB was operated as a multi-operator core network (MOCN) and was one of the first in the world.

== See also ==
- Telecom infrastructure sharing
