= Telia Lietuva =

Telecommunication company in Lithuania

Telia Lietuva, AB

- Headquarters in Vilnius
- Type: Private
- Industry: Mobile network operator, Internet services operator, Television provider
- Founded: 1991; 35 years ago
- Founder: Juozas P. Kazickas and Viktoras Gediminas Gruodis
- Headquarters: Vilnius, Lithuania
- Area served: Lithuania
- Key people: Giedrė Kaminskaitė-Salters (CEO); Stefan Backman (Chairman)
- Revenue: ▲€491.1 million (2024)
- Operating income: ▲€88.5 million (2024)
- Net income: ▲€71.6 million (2024)
- Number of employees: 1,781 (2024)
- Parent: Telia Company (88.15%)
- Website: telia.lt

Telia Lietuva, a member of Telia Company group, is one of the largest telecommunication companies in the Baltic states.

== History ==
Founded in 1991 by Juozas Kazickas as Litcom, Omnitel was Lithuania's first private telecommunications company. In August 2004, Omnitel was acquired by TeliaSonera.

Omnitel was the first network operator in Lithuania to launch GSM services (in 1995) and one of the first companies in Europe having introduced packet data transfer technology GPRS (General Packet Radio Service) in its network. Omnitel was the first in Lithuania to start the commercial 3G services in 2006, which was followed by the highest speed mobile internet HSDPA.

In 2014, Omnitel was the first network operator to launch 4G services across Lithuania, which became fully covered in 2015.

In 2016, Omnitel and Teo began offering new joint services. In 2017, Omnitel was renamed to Telia LT.

In 2018, Telia got permission to use the 3500Mhz band (Band 78) for 5G trials and testing.

In March 2022, Telia LT started deactivating the 3G network to improve the coverage and quality of the 4G network; by the end of May, one-third of 3G base stations, serving about half of subscribers, were shut down.

In November 2022, Telia LT shut down 3G in the whole country and reused the 3G band for 4G capacity layer to add more speed in the country together with bands 1 and 28.

In 2022 September, Telia LT turned on 5G on 700Mhz (Band 28) as 4G/5G and 3500Mhz (Band 78) as only 5G.

In June 2023, Telia covers 99% of Lithuania with Low Band 5G, being the first operator to achieve that in the Baltics.

== Television ==
TELIA TV is the cable operator, founded in 2016, it has 100 channels in total.
