= Telia, India =

Telia is a village situated at the bank of tributary Kolong in Nagaon district of Assam, India.

It is about a half kilometer away from the district headquarters of Nagaon. The majority of the villagers follow Hinduism, and practise farming.
