= Personal Digital Cellular =

Personal Digital Cellular (PDC) was a 2G mobile telecommunications standard used exclusively in Japan.

After a peak of nearly 80 million subscribers to PDC, it had 46 million subscribers in December 2005, and was slowly phased out in favor of 3G technologies like W-CDMA and CDMA2000. At the end of March 2012, the count had dwindled down to almost 200,000 subscribers. NTT Docomo shut down their network, mova, on April 1, 2012 at midnight.

== Technical overview ==
Like D-AMPS and GSM, PDC uses TDMA. The standard was defined by the RCR (later became ARIB) in April 1991, and NTT DoCoMo launched its Digital mova service in March 1993. PDC uses 25 kHz carrier, pi/4-DQPSK modulation with 3-timeslot 11.2 kbit/s (full-rate) or 6-timeslot 5.6 kbit/s (half-rate) voice codecs.

PDC is implemented in the 800 MHz (downlink 810–888 MHz, uplink 893–958 MHz), and 1.5 GHz (downlink 1477–1501 MHz, uplink 1429–1453 MHz) bands. The air interface is defined in RCR STD-27 and the core network MAP by JJ-70.10. NEC, Motorola, and Ericsson are the major network equipment manufacturers.

The services include voice (full and half-rate), supplementary services (call waiting, voice mail, three-way calling, call forwarding, and so on), data service (up to 9.6 kbit/s CSD), and packet-switched wireless data (up to 28.8 kbit/s PDC-P). Voice codecs are PDC-EFR and PDC-HR.

Compared to GSM, PDC's weak broadcast strength allows small, portable phones with light batteries at the expense of substandard voice quality and problems maintaining the connection, particularly in enclosed spaces like elevators.

=== PDC-EFR ===
PDC Enhanced Full Rate is a speech coding standard that was developed by ARIB in Japan and used in PDC mobile networks in Japan. The carriers use one of those codecs as PDC-EFR: CS-ACELP 8 kbit/s (a.k.a. NTT DoCoMo Hypertalk) and ACELP 6.7 kbit/s (a.k.a. J-PHONE Crystal Voice).

The PDC-EFR CS-ACELP uses G.729. The PDC-EFR ACELP is compatible with the AMR mode AMR_6.70.

=== PDC-HR ===
PDC Half Rate is a speech coding standard that was developed by ARIB in Japan and used in PDC mobile networks in Japan. It operates with a bit-rate of 3.45 kbit/s and is based on Pitch Synchronous Innovation CELP (PSI-CELP).

== Operators of PDC service ==
- NTT DoCoMo (mova brand): Service terminated on March 31, 2012
- SoftBank Mobile (SoftBank 6-2 brand): Service terminated on March 31, 2010
- KDDI
  - au: Service terminated on March 31, 2003
  - TU-KA: Service terminated on March 31, 2008

== Standardization organizations ==
- Association of Radio Industries and Businesses (ARIB)
- Telecommunication Technology Committee (TTC)

== See also ==
- AMR
- PDC-FR - VSELP-based old full-rate codec
