= Swedish Post and Telecom Authority =

Swedish regulatory authority for telecommunication

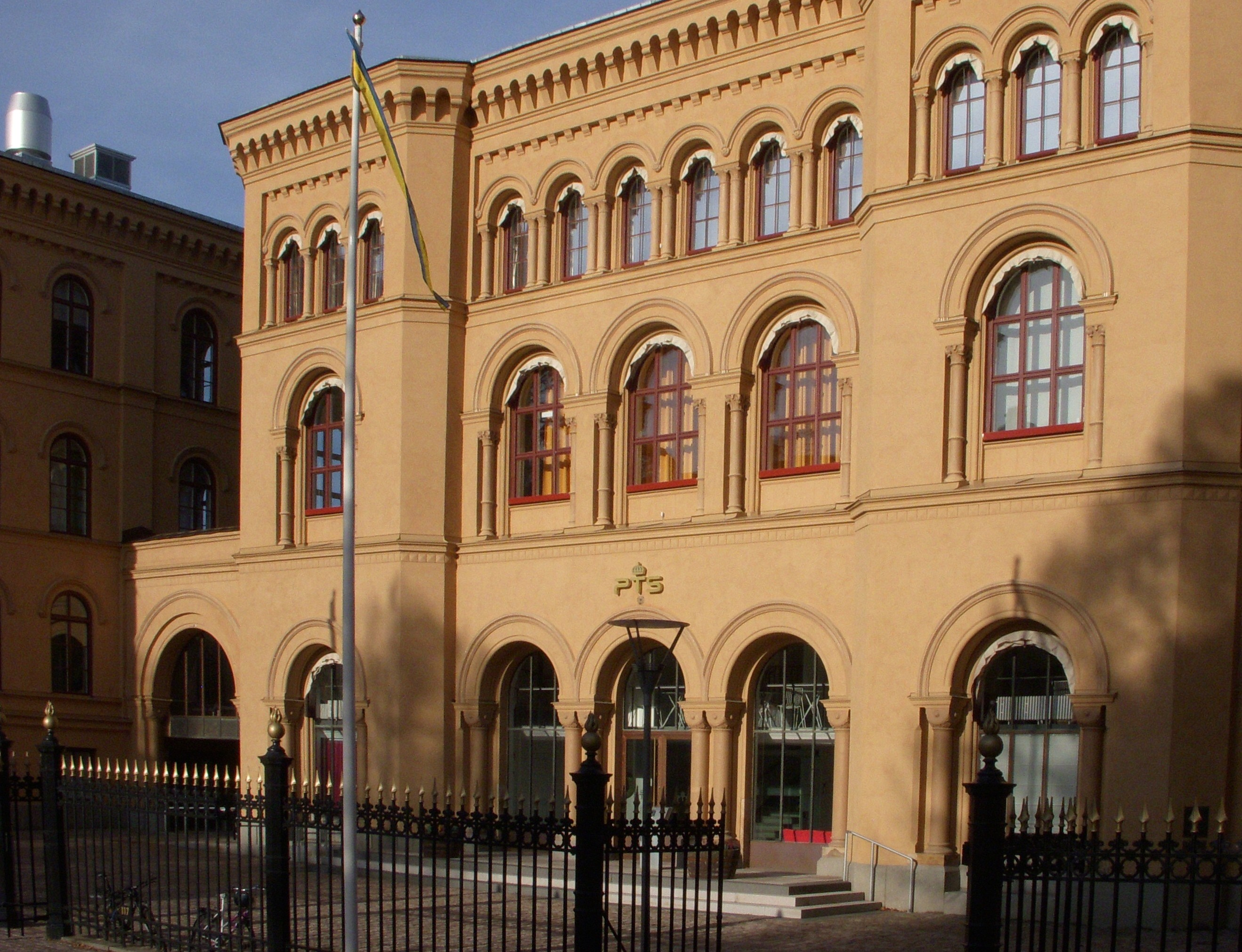
Headquarters at Valhallavägen in Stockholm

The Swedish Post and Telecom Authority (Swedish: Post- och telestyrelsen, abbreviated PTS) is a government authority under the Ministry of Infrastructure (Sweden) and is managed by a board of directors appointed by the Swedish government. The Director-General is the chief executive officer of the organisation. Dan Sjöblom has served as Director General since February 2017.

It was formed on 1 July 1992 (as Telestyrelsen) from a split of the regulatory functions of the former state-owned telecommunications operator Televerket ahead of its corporatisation into Telia the following year. The agency adopted its current name on 1 March 1994.

PTS is the sector authority within the field of electronic communications and postal services. Their area of responsibility is to monitor competition and consumer issues in this field; ensuring efficient utilisation of resources and secure communications in mail, telephony, the Internet and radio.

== See also ==
- Spectrum auction
