= Net4Mobility =

- Company type: Joint Venture
- Industry: Telecommunications
- Founded: April 2009
- Area served: Sweden
- Owner: Tele2, Telenor
- Website: net4mobility.com

Net4Mobility is a joint venture between Telenor Sweden and Tele2 Sweden. The company’s main goal is to build, own and operate a GSM (2G), LTE (4G) and 5G NR Network and Transmission Network in Sweden. The mobile network covers 99 percent of the Swedish population and enable Telenor Sweden and Tele2 Sweden to offer data (LTE and 5G NR) and voice (GSM) services to their customers. Net4Mobility was founded April 2009, and currently operates in the 700, 800, 900, 1800 and 2600 MHz bands. Recently the company initiated an expansion programme in order to also cover up to 90% of the geographical area of Sweden.

On the 13th of June 2016 the company enabled LTE Advanced services on the majority of its network footprint.

In the PTS auction for frequency blocks in the 2600 MHz band, Tele2 and Telenor each won a 20 MHz block resulting in a total available spectrum of 40 MHz for the joint venture. Currently, only the first 20 MHz band (the one awarded to Tele2) is in use across the entire network but the second band can be activated once usage increases. With LTE-Advanced, multiple bands can be used and the total of 2x20MHz would yield speeds up to a theoretical max of 300 Mbit/s. 290 Mbit/s have been proven in lab environments. In the PTS auction for 5G NR in January 2021, Net4Mobility was awarded the 3620-3720 MHz band.

While the radio network and certain parts of the access network is shared, the mobile core as well as the majority of the transmission network is not shared but operated individually by Tele2 and Telenor respectively.

== 5G network ==
In 2021, Net4Mobility started rolling out 5G network with equipment from Nokia and Ericsson.

== See also ==
- Telenor
- Tele2
