= Telia Norge =

Subsidiary of the Swedish corporation Telia Company

Telia Norge AS

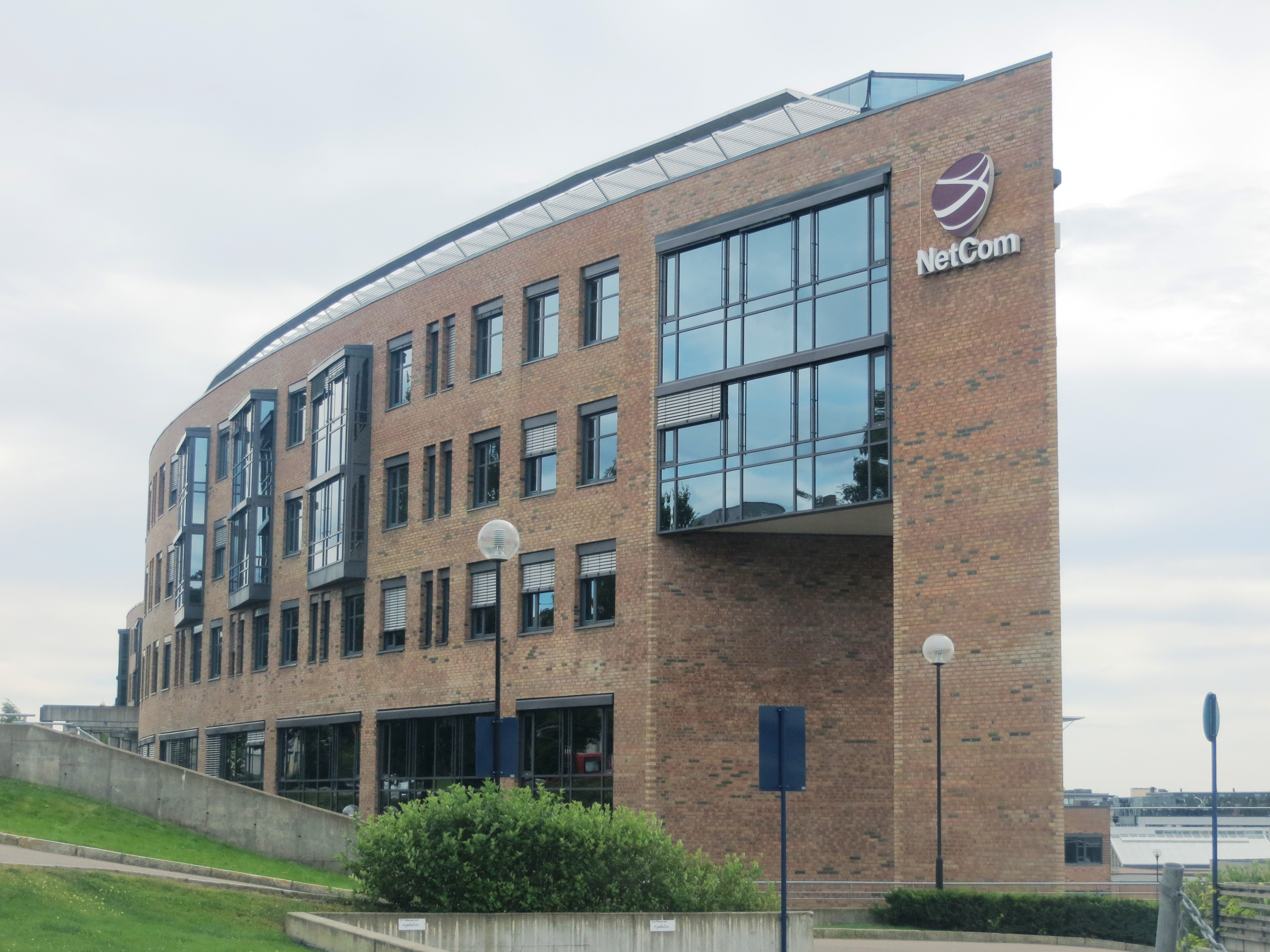
- Headquarters in Oslo
- Formerly: NetCom AS
- Company type: Private
- Industry: Telecommunications
- Founded: 1993; 33 years ago (as NetCom AS)
- Headquarters: Oslo, Norway
- Products: Telecommunication services
- Brands: Telia; OneCall; MyCall
- Revenue: €1.414 billion (2022)
- Number of employees: 1,734 (2026)
- Parent: Telia Company
- Website: www.telia.no

Telia Norge AS, formerly NetCom AS, is a Norwegian telecommunications company. Founded in 1993, it is the second largest provider in Norway. The company has about 1.8 million mobile subscribers, and about 500,000 TV and broadband subscribers (September 2025), and the company headquarters are located at Økern Portal in Oslo. It is owned by the Swedish company Telia Company. The Telia office in Trondheim consists mainly of sales, customer service and technical departments. Telia was for a while the exclusive carrier for iPhone (iPhone 3G) in Norway, until Telenor signed an agreement with Apple Inc. to also distribute the device in Scandinavia.

== Availability for tracking customers whereabouts ==
An article form Dagens Næringsliv on September 16, 2013, stated that a security weakness at Telia resulted in the availability of "—with simple resources, to track [the whereabouts of] members of parliament and other Telia customers abroad, when they were on a job [trip] or on a holiday"—until the weakness was rectified (tette hullet) on September 12, 2013.

== Name change to Telia ==
On 1 March 2016 NetCom changed its name to Telia, most likely to avoid confusing their customers as they have been sharing TeliaSonera's logo for multiple years prior to the name change. They launched their "ROAM LIKE HOME" offer right after, allowing customers to use their existing mobile subscriptions in all Nordic and Baltic countries (With the exception of Iceland, Greenland and the Faroe Islands). They were the first mobile operator in Norway to provide a service of this nature. Until now, competing mobile operators had simply been offering roaming packs of mobile data at slightly discounted rates.
