= Telia Company =

Swedish multinational telecommunication provider

Telia Company AB

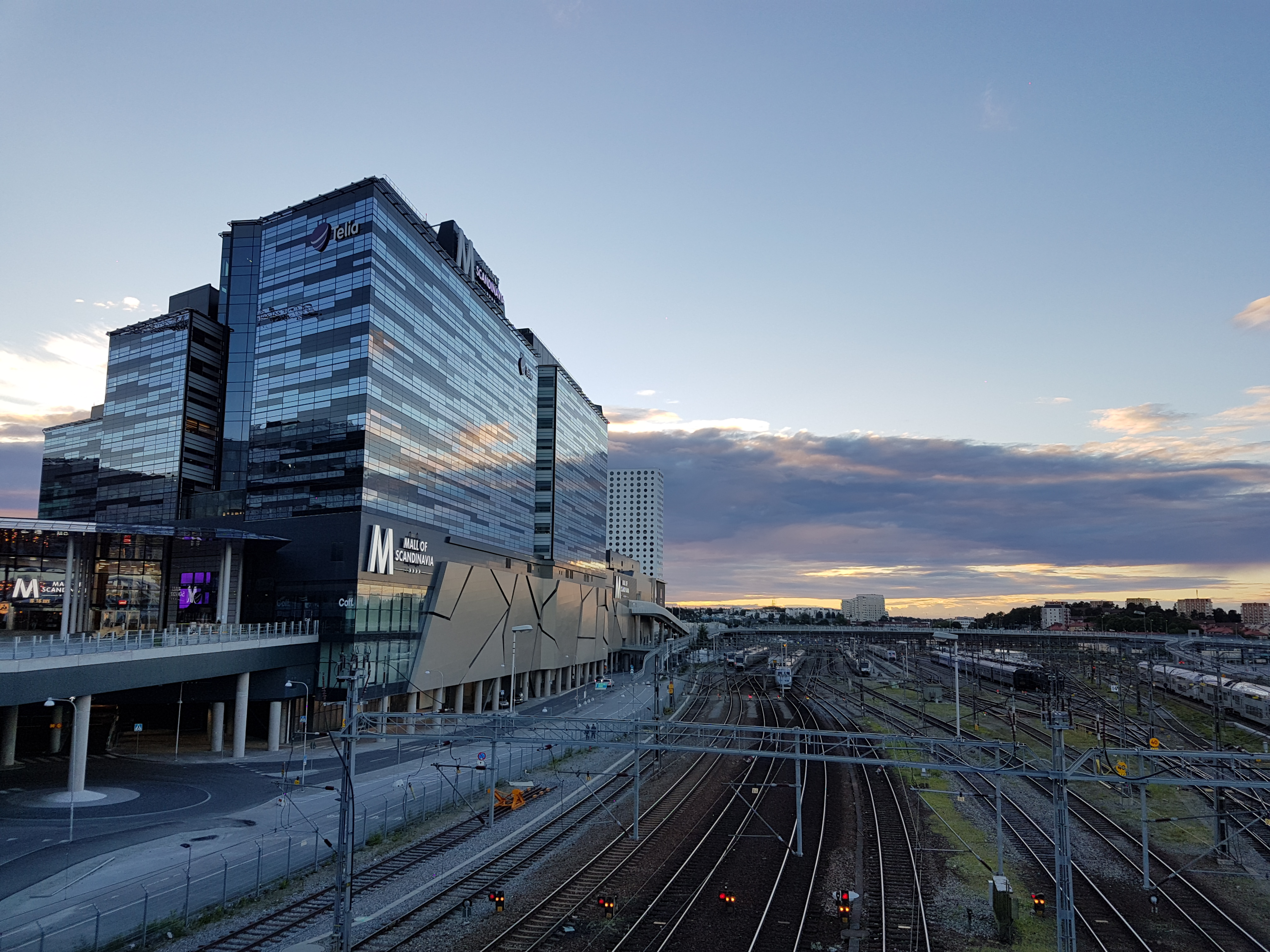
- Telia headquarters in Mall of Scandinavia, Solna, Stockholm
- Type: Public
- Traded as: Nasdaq Stockholm: TELIA; Nasdaq Helsinki: TELIA1; OMX Stockholm 30
- ISIN: SE0000667925
- Industry: Telecommunications
- Founded: December 2002; 23 years ago
- Headquarters: Solna, Stockholm, Sweden
- Area served: Europe
- Key people: Patrik Hofbauer (president and CEO); Lars-Johan Jarnheimer (chairman of the board)
- Products: Mobile telephony; Internet access; fixed-line communications; IT hosting
- Revenue: SEK 88.561 billion €7.712 billion (2023)
- Operating income: SEK 4.980 billion €434 million (2023)
- Net income: SEK 0.897 billion €78 million (2023)
- Owner: Government of Sweden (39.5%)
- Number of employees: 20,800
- Subsidiaries: Telia Sverige; Telia Finland; Telia Norge; Telia Eesti; Telia Lietuva; Telia Finance
- Website: www.teliacompany.com/en

Telia shared services center in Vilnius, Lithuania

Telia Company AB is a Swedish multinational telecommunications company and mobile network operator present in Sweden, Finland, Norway, Estonia, Latvia and Lithuania.

The company is headquartered in Solna and its stock is traded on the Stockholm Stock Exchange and on the Helsinki Stock Exchange.

The company has been linked to corruption scandals in its dealings with the regimes in Uzbekistan and Azerbaijan. Telia's bribery scandal in relation to the Ilham Aliyev regime in Azerbaijan has been described as "possibly the largest bribery in Swedish history."

== History ==
Telia Company in its current form was first established as TeliaSonera, as the result of a 2002 merger between the Swedish and Finnish telecommunications companies, Telia and Sonera. This merger followed three years after Telia's failed merger attempt with Norwegian telecommunications company Telenor, now its chief competitor in the Nordic countries.

Before privatisation, Telia was a state telephone monopoly. Sonera, on the other hand, had a monopoly only on trunk network calls, while most (c. 75%) of local telecommunication was provided by telephone cooperatives. The separate brands Telia and Sonera continued to be used in the Swedish and Finnish markets respectively until March 2017, when Sonera was rebranded to Telia. Of the stock, 39.5% (31 March 2020) is owned by the Swedish government, and the rest by institutions, companies, and private investors worldwide. The Finnish government (through Solidium) divested from Telia Company in February 2018, when it sold its remaining 3.2% stake.

=== Telia ===
The Swedish Kungl. Telegrafverket (literally: Royal Telegraph Agency) was founded in 1853, when the first electric telegraph line was established between Stockholm and Uppsala. Allmänna Telefon found an equipment supplier in Lars Magnus Ericsson. In this early competition, Telegrafverket with its brand Rikstelefon was a latecomer. However, by securing a national monopoly on long-distance telephone lines, it was able with time to control and take over the local networks of quickly growing private telephone companies.

A de facto telephone monopoly position was reached around 1920, and never needed legal sanction. In 1953 the name was modernised to Televerket. On 1 July 1992, this huge government agency's regulating functions was split off into the Swedish Post and Telecom Authority (Swedish: Post- och telestyrelsen, PTS), with similar functions as the Federal Communications Commission of the United States. The operation of the state radio and TV broadcast network was spun off into a company named Teracom. On 1 July 1993, the remaining telephone and mobile network operator was transformed into a government-owned shareholding company, named Telia AB. At the height of the dot-com bubble, on 13 June 2000, close to one-third of Telia's shares were introduced on the Stockholm Stock Exchange.

In the 1980s, Televerket was a pioneering mobile network operator with the NMT system, followed in the 1990s by GSM. Private competition in analogue mobile phone systems had already broken the telephone monopoly, and the growing internet allowed more opportunities for competitors. The most important of Telia's Swedish competitors in these areas has been Tele2. When PTS awarded four licences for the 3rd generation mobile networks in December 2000, Telia was not among the winners, but later established an agreement to build a 3G network jointly with Tele2 using Tele2's licence. SUNAB was founded as the jointly owned company that would in turn build, own and operate the joint 3G network. In December 2018, Telia in cooperation with Ericsson launched Sweden's first 5G network at KTH Royal Institute of Technology in Stockholm.

=== Sonera ===
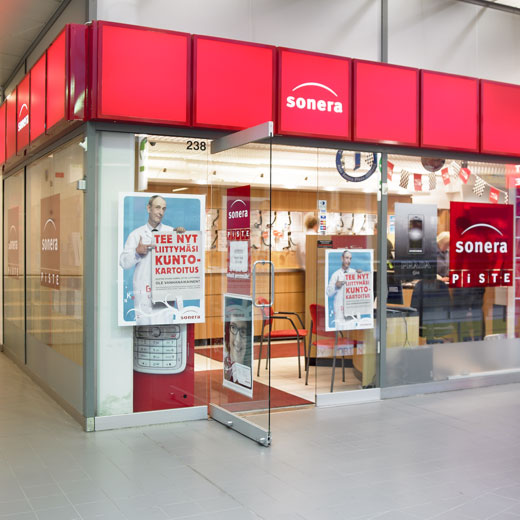
Sonera's former sales point

Telecom Finland, established in 1917 as the Finnish Telegraph Agency, changed its name to Sonera in 1998, and went on to merge with Telia in 2002, forming TeliaSonera.

=== After the merger ===
Former Sonera logo 2011–2017

Former logo until 2022

During the run-up to the 2006 general election the Swedish liberal-conservative Alliance stated as one of its policy aims to reduce government ownership in commercial entities, and specifically to sell its stake in TeliaSonera. The Alliance went on to win the election and formed a coalition government. After the merger with Sonera, the Swedish State held 46% of the shares and with parliamentary approval the government sold down to 37.3%.

On 16 March 2011, the Alliance administration lost a parliamentary vote on sale of publicly owned commercial entities, including TeliaSonera, when a coalition of all opposition parties — the Left Party, Social Democratic Party, Green Party and Sweden Democrats — united against the Alliance.

In the beginning of 2008, TeliaSonera announced measures to save nearly 500 million euros which would include 2,900 redundancies: 2,000 from Sweden and 900 from Finland. France Télécom (now Orange S.A.) proposed a 33 billion euro acquisition offer for TeliaSonera on 5 June 2008, which was promptly rejected by the company's board.

Further divestment of TeliaSonera was presented to the parliament after the 2010 election, at which the Alliance lost its majority but stayed on as a minority administration.

On 12 April 2016, the company changed its name to Telia Company, dropping the Sonera part, rebranding the company to aid recovery after bribery and money laundering allegations.

On 20 July 2018, Telia Company announced the acquisition proposal of Bonnier Broadcasting Group from Bonnier Group for 9.2 billion SEK (roughly $1 billion), thus owning TV4 AB (commercial television broadcaster in Sweden), MTV Oy (commercial television broadcaster in Finland) and C More Entertainment (pan-Nordic operator of premium television channels). The European Commission approved the deal on 12 November 2019 with certain conditions, and the acquisition was completed on 2 December that year.

Ahead of the completion of Bonnier Broadcasting deal, the Telia Company nomination committee proposed on 20 October 2019, that Marie Ehrling be succeeded by Lars-Johan Jarnheimer, the former CEO of Tele2 until 2008, and then-chair of Egmont Media, as the company's board chair. The proposal was approved on 26 November that year, following the extraordinary general meeting. Meanwhile, on 24 October, Telia Company appointed Allison Kirkby, the former CEO of Tele2 from 2015 until 2018 and then went on to become the president and CEO of TDC, as the company's new president and CEO. Kirkby assumed office on 4 May 2020.

On 6 October 2020, Telia Company agreed to sell its Internet backbone unit Telia Carrier to Polhem Infra for roughly US$1 billion. The sale was completed on 1 June 2021.

On 25 February 2025, Telia announced that it was selling its media division to Schibsted Media in order to focus on its consumer division, the sale is scheduled to be completed by Q3 2025, pending regulatory approval.

== Operations ==
Telia Company is the largest Nordic and Baltic fixed-voice, broadband, and mobile operator by revenue and customer base. It also owns a TV-media operation which includes TV4 in Sweden and MTV in Finland as well as C More.

Telia mobile telephone business in Europe:

- Leader company - Sweden, Estonia and Lithuania
- Second company - Finland and Norway

=== Estonia ===
Telia Company owns 100% of Telia Eesti, one of the largest telecommunication companies in the Baltic countries and the largest in Estonia. TeliaSonera and the Estonian government reached a deal over the sale of what was Eesti Telekom in September 2009. The company changed its name to Telia Eesti on 20 January 2016.

=== Finland ===
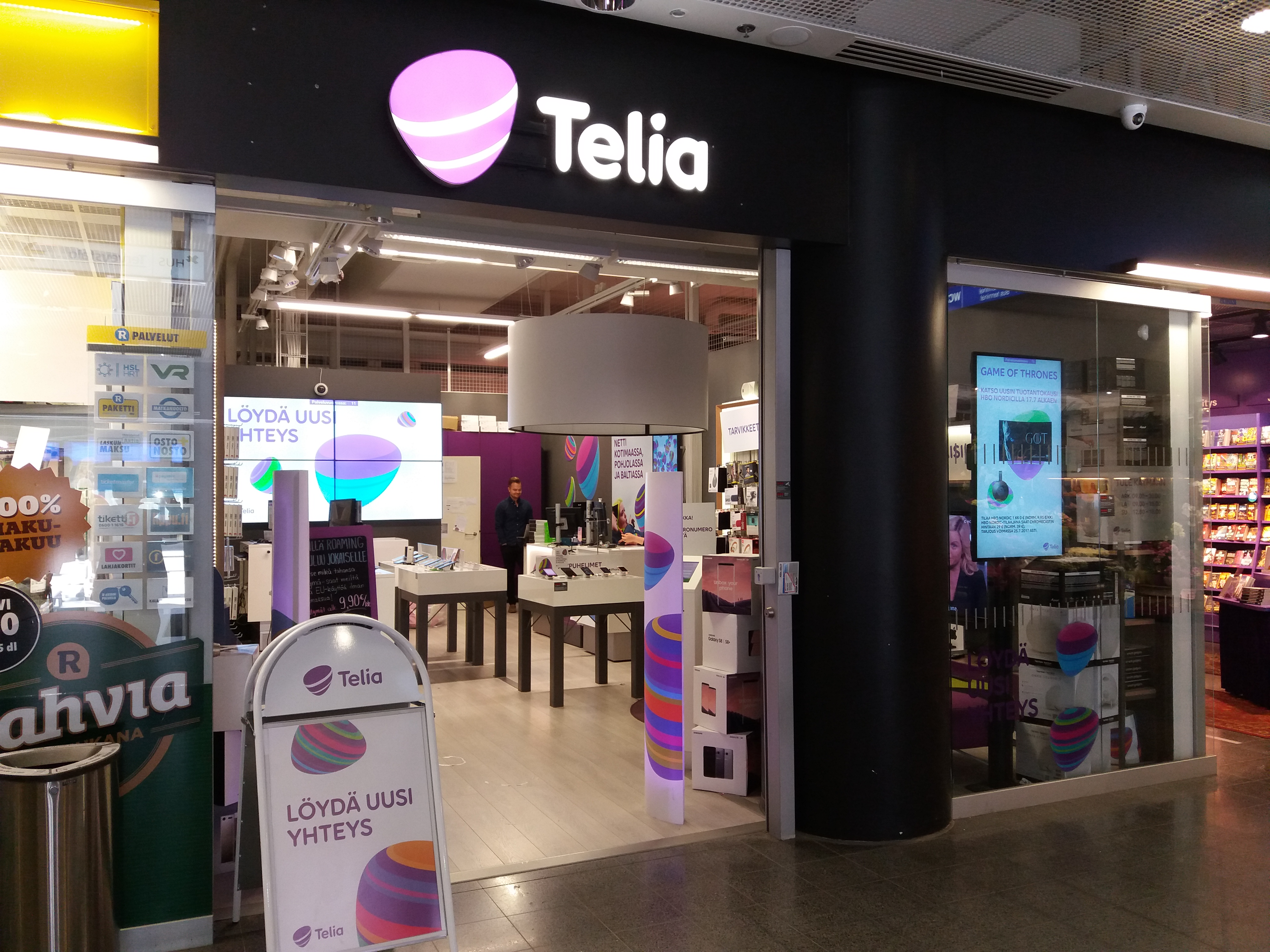
A Telia Finland store in Tikkurila, Vantaa

Telia Finland is the second largest mobile operator in Finland and also one of the biggest providers of landline telephone and internet services. Before the rebranding on 23 March 2017, Telia was known in Finland under the brands of Sonera and Tele Finland. In September 1999, Sonera became the world's first mobile operator to launch mobile Internet services via Wireless Application Protocol (WAP).

Since 2014, Telia Finland and DNA Oyj have jointly deployed a shared 4G LTE network using the 800 MHz (LTE Band 20) "digital dividend" band in remote Northern and Eastern Finland under the Suomen Yhteisverkko Oy joint venture. Telia Finland owns 51% of Suomen Yhteisverkko Oy.

=== Latvia ===
Telia Company owns 49% of LMT (24.5% as Telia Company AB and 24.5% as Sonera Holding B.V.) and 49% of Tet, which owns 23% of LMT. Telia Latvija, a business cable operator and data centre operator, was sold to Tet.

On 15 July 2025, Government of Latvia announced that they plan to buy out Telia Company's shares of both LMT and Tet with help from Latvenergo and Latvian State Radio and Television Centre (LVRTC), to make both companies state-owned. Telia confirmed the sale on 17 July by signing a memorandum of understanding with Latvia, Latvenergo and LVRTC, with the transaction expected to be completed in the first half of 2026.

=== Lithuania ===
TeliaSonera owns 88.15% of Telia Lietuva (Teo LT until 2017), the largest landline phone operator in Lithuania, which recently purchased Omnitel, one of largest mobile network operators there. It was previously owned by TeliaSonera group. In October 2015, TeliaSonera announced the merger of Teo and Omnitel, through the acquisition of Omnitel by Teo. On 1 February 2017, Omnitel and Teo merged under the name of "Telia Lietuva".

=== Norway ===
In Norway, Telia first entered after the de-regulation in 1998 as a virtual supplier of fixed telephone and Internet services. This was sold to Enitel during the merger attempt with Telenor, but Telia re-entered in 2000 with the purchase of one of the two mobile network operators, NetCom. In 2006 it also bought the virtual mobile provider Chess Communication. On 1 March 2016, NetCom changed its name to Telia Norge. In July 2018, Telia acquired Get AS and TDC Norway for $2.6 billion.

=== Sweden ===
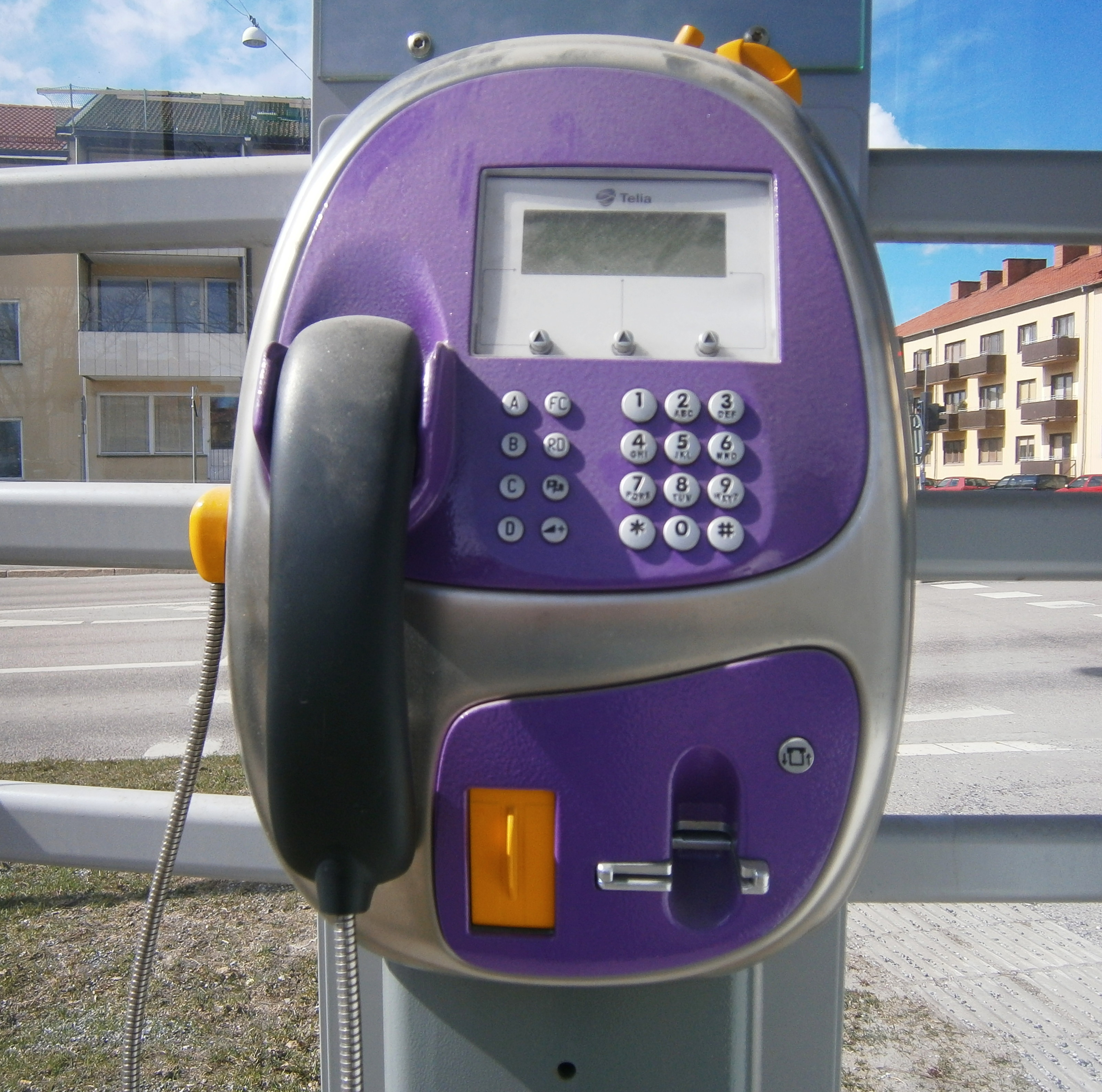
Swedish Telia payphone

In Sweden, Telia Company operates under the consumer brands Telia and its lower-cost flanker brands Halebop and Fello. On the business side, Skanova Access and Cygate are also used. Telia Sverige is currently the largest mobile phone operator in Sweden, both in terms of revenue and customer base. Main competitors include Tele2, Telenor, 3, Allente and Boxer.

== Former operations ==
=== Afghanistan ===
In July 2020, Telia Company announced it has divested its 12.25% share in the Afghan Roshan (telco) cellphone network.

=== Azerbaijan ===
On 15 May 2010, after Azercell went through rebranding, it joined the network of TeliaSonera. On 5 March 2018, Telia confirmed they have sold their stake in Azercell.

=== Cambodia ===
TeliaSonera purchased a majority stake in Star-Cell in 2008 which was the number four player in the market at that time. By 2010 it exited Cambodia after a $100 million write down and collapse in subscriber numbers. It was subsequently taken over by a more dominant competitor Smart Mobile.

=== Denmark ===
TT-Netværket
- ISIN: SE0000667925
- Headquarters: Sweden
- Revenue: 86,000,000,000 Swedish krona (2019)
- Net income: 7,601,000,000 Swedish krona (2019)
- Number of employees: 20,800 (2019)

In Denmark, Telia Company operated a mobile operator (Telia), a mobile virtual network operator (Call Me), and a broadband supplier (Telia). The company started in 1995, the result of a merger between Telia Stofa and TeliaSonera. In 2014, Telia and Telenor announced their plan to merge and create a 50/50 joint-venture, but this fell through in 2015 after failed negotiations with the EU regulators. The two companies do operate a 50/50 joint-venture for their network infrastructure operations and spectrum holdings called TT-Netværket (TT-Network).

Telia Broadband was relaunched in 2008 because of the need for TeliaSonera to offer both mobile and broadband in all of their home markets (Sweden, Norway, Denmark and Finland). Telia Broadband was the first operator to launch digital TV with their broadband at no extra cost. Stofa is mainly a cable TV operator, but also supplies broadband via the cable TV network.

Telia Company sold its operations and network assets in Denmark to Norlys a.m.b.a. (Norlys) at an enterprise value of DKK 6.25 billion, on a cash and debt-free basis on 2 April 2024.

=== Georgia ===
From 2007 to 2018, Telia Company has owned 58.55% of the Geocell company, while Turkcell owns the remaining 41.45%. Since 2018 Silknet bought full part of Geocell.

=== Sri Lanka ===
From 1996 to 2010, Telia Company has owned 100% of SUNTEL Ltd. Since 2010 Dialog Axiata bought full part of Suntel.

=== Kazakhstan ===
Telia Company operated in Kazakhstan under the brand Kcell. From 21 December 2018, Kcell sold to Kazakhtelecom.

=== Moldova ===
In February 2020, Telia Company agreed to sell its 100% holding in Moldcell to CG Cell Technologies DAC, for a transaction price of US$31.5 million.

=== Nepal ===
TeliaSonera owned a majority stake in Ncell, the largest mobile operator in Nepal with US$16.2 billion operating income. On 21 December 2015, TeliaSonera announced its exit from Ncell, selling its 60.4 per cent of the shares to Malaysian telecommunications group Axiata. TeliaSonera exited Nepal without settling billions of Capital Gains Tax owed to Nepalese government.

=== Russia ===
Telia Company owned 25.2% of MegaFon, the second largest mobile phone operator in Russia. In October 2017, Telia Company agreed to sell their entire MegaFon stake for US$1 billion.

=== Spain ===
Telia Company owned a 76.6% holding in the Spanish operator Yoigo until 21 June 2016 when it was sold to Masmovil.

=== Tajikistan ===
Telia Company owned 60% of mobile phone operator Tcell. Tcell is a merger of Somoncom and Indigo Tajikistan; the merger was completed in July 2012. On 27 April 2017, it was confirmed that Tcell has been sold.

=== Turkey ===
In October 2020, Telia Company's divestment of its 47.1 per cent stake in Turkcell Holding (which holds 51% in the listed leading mobile operator in Turkey) to the state owned Turkey Wealth Fund for US$530 million, was completed.

=== Uzbekistan ===
In five years, Ucell, the Uzbek subsidiary, increased the number of its subscribers from 400,000 to 9 million (2012). Some former TeliaSonera executives were under preliminary investigation by Swedish prosecutors for allegations of bribery and money laundering associated with the acquisition of their 3G licence in Uzbekistan from Takilant Limited, registered in Gibraltar. Under these investigations involving four Uzbek nationals, hundreds of millions of francs were frozen in Swiss banks. The former executives were acquitted in the first instance in the Swedish legal proceedings in February 2019, the verdict has been appealed.

In September 2017 Telia Company announced that a global settlement had been reached with the US Department of Justice (DOJ), Securities and Exchange Commission (SEC) and the Dutch Public Prosecution Service (Openbaar Ministerie, OM) relating to previously disclosed investigations regarding historical transactions in Uzbekistan.

== Evolution of the Telia brand ==
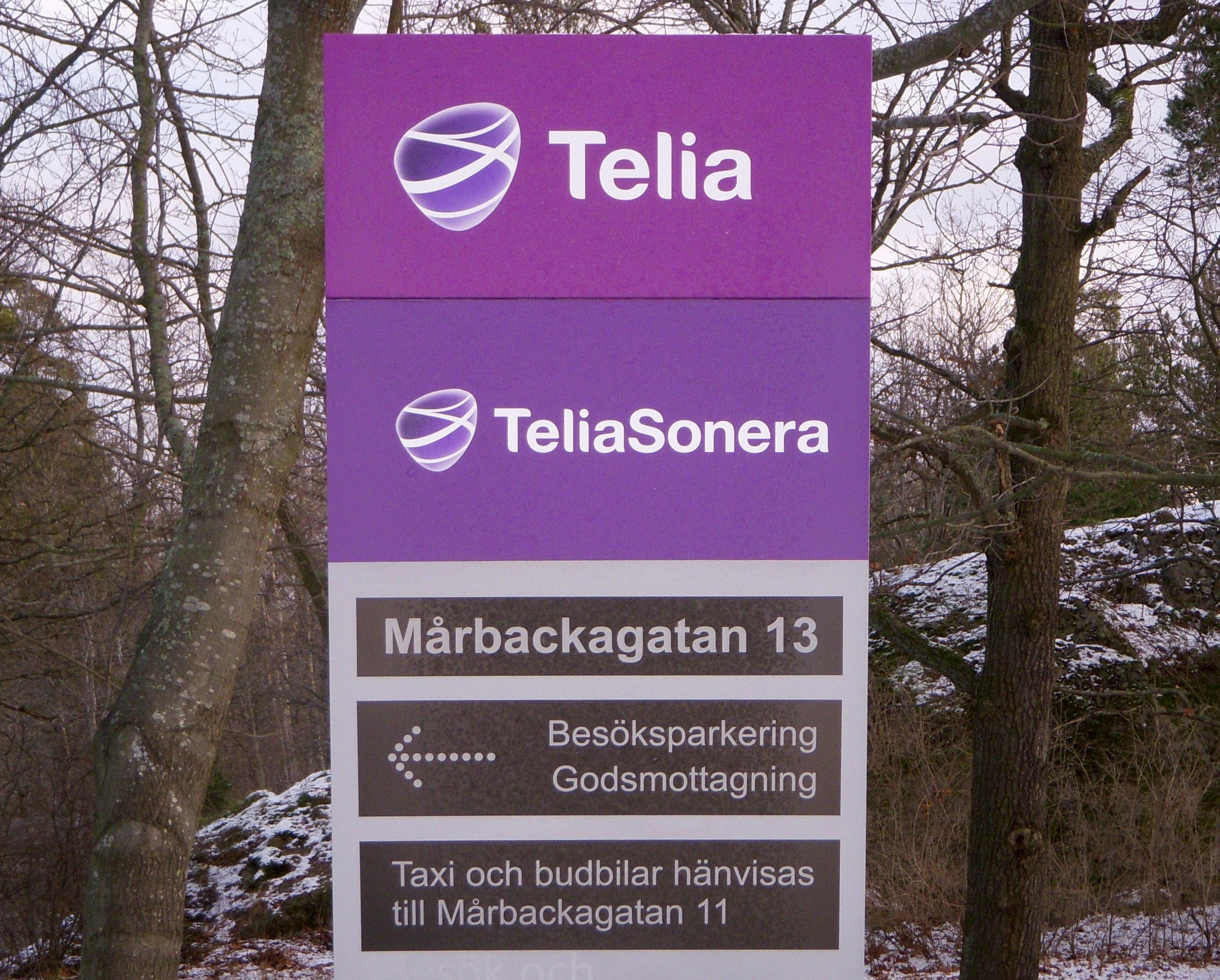
TeliaSonera

When Telia and Sonera merged in 2002, TeliaSonera used a simple wordmark as the logo. In 2011, TeliaSonera released its new purple pebble logo to the corporation and its affiliate brands. The pebble was designed by Landor Associates.

In 2016, TeliaSonera changed name to Telia Company and presented an updated pebble brand profile, designed by Wolff Olins, to be used by all Telia brand companies.

== Controversies ==
TeliaSonera has been accused of indirectly supporting dictatorships, allowing them to do man-in-the-middle attacks on their citizens. This was disclosed in the Swedish TV show Uppdrag Granskning in 2012. TeliaSonera responded to these allegations with: "This is happening every day in all countries and applies to all operators. We are obliged to comply with the legislation of each country."

Further allegations have been presented in Swedish media and elsewhere that TeliaSonera may have illegally, through bribery, acquired licences in Uzbekistan and Azerbaijan. As a result of internal investigations on these and other potential violations to the company's policies, several senior managers were dismissed from the company. Telia admitted to this bribery accusations and had to pay US$965 million in settlement in 2017.

When TeliaSonera exited Nepal there were voices raised in the public debate in Nepal that it had evaded an approximately 36 billion rupee capital gains tax owed to the Nepalese government, when it sold its stake to Axiata, a Malaysian Telecom Group, a claim which has been refuted by Telia Company on several occasions. In that context, Telia was criticised by media (TV) even in Sweden where its headquarters is located. Also, a group of Nepalese people started a movement 'No Tax.. No Ncell' to boycott the services of Ncell in Nepal.

== See also ==
- List of Finnish companies
- List of mobile network operators in Europe
- List of Swedish companies
- Telia Carrier
