= Telecom infrastructure sharing =

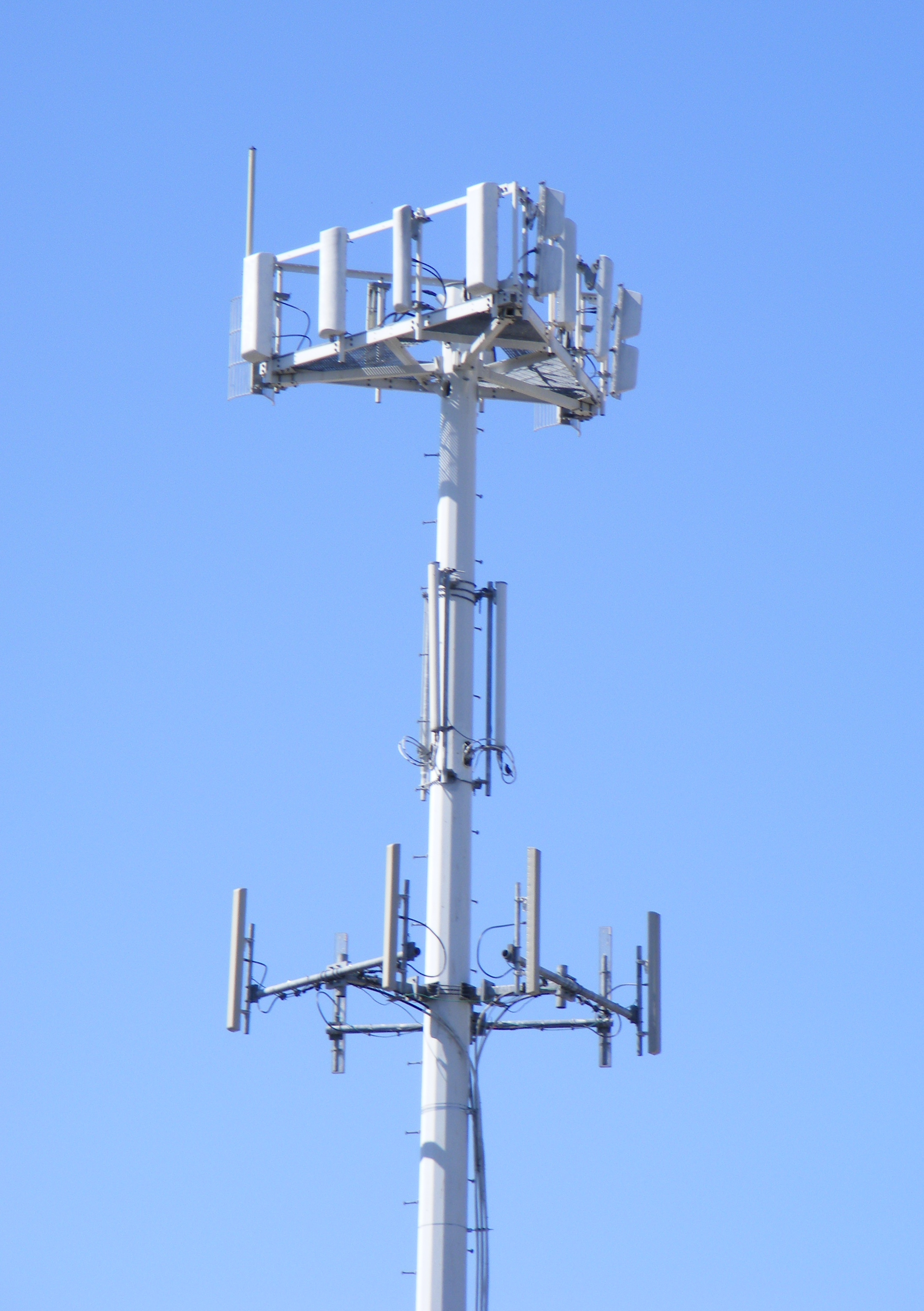
A cell phone (mobile phone) tower

Due to economy of scale property of telecommunication industry, sharing of telecom infrastructure among telecom service providers is becoming the requirement and process of business in the telecom industry where competitors are becoming partners in order to lower their increasing investments. The degree and method of infrastructure sharing can vary in each country depending on regulatory and competitive climate.

== Regulatory view ==
=== United States ===
The Federal Communications Commission (FCC), as an independent agency of the United States government, was established by the Communications Act of 1934. As the successor to the Federal Radio Commission, FCC took charge of regulating all non-federal government use of the radio spectrum (including radio and television broadcasts), all interstate telecommunications (broadband, wireless and satellite), and all international communications originating or terminating in the United States.

In 1996, the U.S. Congress passed the Telecommunications Act of 1996, which was later recognised as a watershed moment for the competitiveness of the US telecommunications industry. By deregulating infrastructure, it introduced competition into the market. The Telecommunications Act of 1996 put incumbent telecommunications carriers under the following obligations:

- Access to rights of way—the duty to afford access to the poles, ducts, conduits, and rights-of-way of such carrier to competing providers of telecommunications. (Section 251 (b))
- Reciprocal compensation—the duty to establish reciprocal compensation arrangements for the transport and termination of telecommunications. (Section 251(b))

Local Exchange Carriers are further obligated as follows:

- Interconnection—the duty to provide, for the facilities or equipment of any requesting telecommunications carrier, interconnection with the local exchange carrier's network. (Section 251 (c))

By the stipulations in the Act, new entrants in the market are able to lease network infrastructure that was built or is being used by their competitors.

=== United Kingdom ===
The UK telecommunications regulator, Ofcom, states that it "encourages mobile network operators to share masts and/or sites where possible" and the Mobile Operators Association (MOA) has published a paper on the subject. There is some co-operation between networks. Mobile Broadband Network Limited (MBNL) is a joint venture between Three and T-Mobile (now EE), and O2 and Vodafone have established a joint team called Cornerstone. The two schemes are different in that MBNL shares antennas and some network equipment while Cornerstone shares the cell sites but not any of the broadcasting equipment.

=== France ===
The three largest French mobile network operators (Orange, Bouygues Telecom and SFR) have since 2008 been legally required by the French government and the French telecommunications regulator ARCEP to provide shared 2G GSM, 3G UMTS and 4G LTE coverage in rural dead zones (zone blanche in French) under the name "F-CONTACT" which, although made up of separate towers and radio access networks hosted by each of the three aforementioned operators, must legally allow their mobile signals to be shared with both postpaid and prepaid subscribers of each of said three operators. MVNOs which are hosted on either the Orange, Bouygues or SFR networks are also usually allowed to roam on each host network's F-CONTACT masts, although some outright choose not to do so for cost reasons. The fourth and newest French mobile network operator Free Mobile has since its commercial launch in January 2012 until 2022 also allowed domestic roaming on the Orange mobile network in 2G and 3G (including F-CONTACT masts hosted by Orange) in areas where Free Mobile does not have native coverage, while Free Mobile continues to build up its own mobile network.

In 2015, the French government announced a plan to upgrade all 268 municipalities in France with neither mobile phone nor mobile internet coverage to at least 3G by the end of 2016, while over 2000 municipalities with only 2G coverage were to be upgraded to 3G by mid-2017, both of which represented a major expansion of F-CONTACT.

== Advantages ==
Infrastructure sharing limits duplication and gears investment toward underserved areas, product innovation, and improved customer service.

Traditionally, telecommunication development shows economy of scale and telecom operator spending has been dominated by considerable investment of technology and infrastructure. Given that such investments are fixed, sunk and irreversible, they represent a high risk factor. Maintaining and upgrading infrastructure make this risk even higher. For example, fixed network operators are migrating to next-generation networks, after most mobile network operators have already deployed the third-generation(3G) infrastructures. Therefore, infrastructure sharing can significantly reduce entrance and development risk.

Infrastructure sharing also has great impact on competition. Market becomes more attractive to new players for decreased entrance barriers. Such players can enrich the competition while investing effectively. By alleviating pressure of network deployment, sharing allows operators to turn their attention to improved innovation, better customer service and eventually better commercial offerings and healthier competition.

== Telecom infrastructure ==
Basically a cell site consists of electronic (active) and non-electronic infrastructure.

== Infrastructure sharing ==
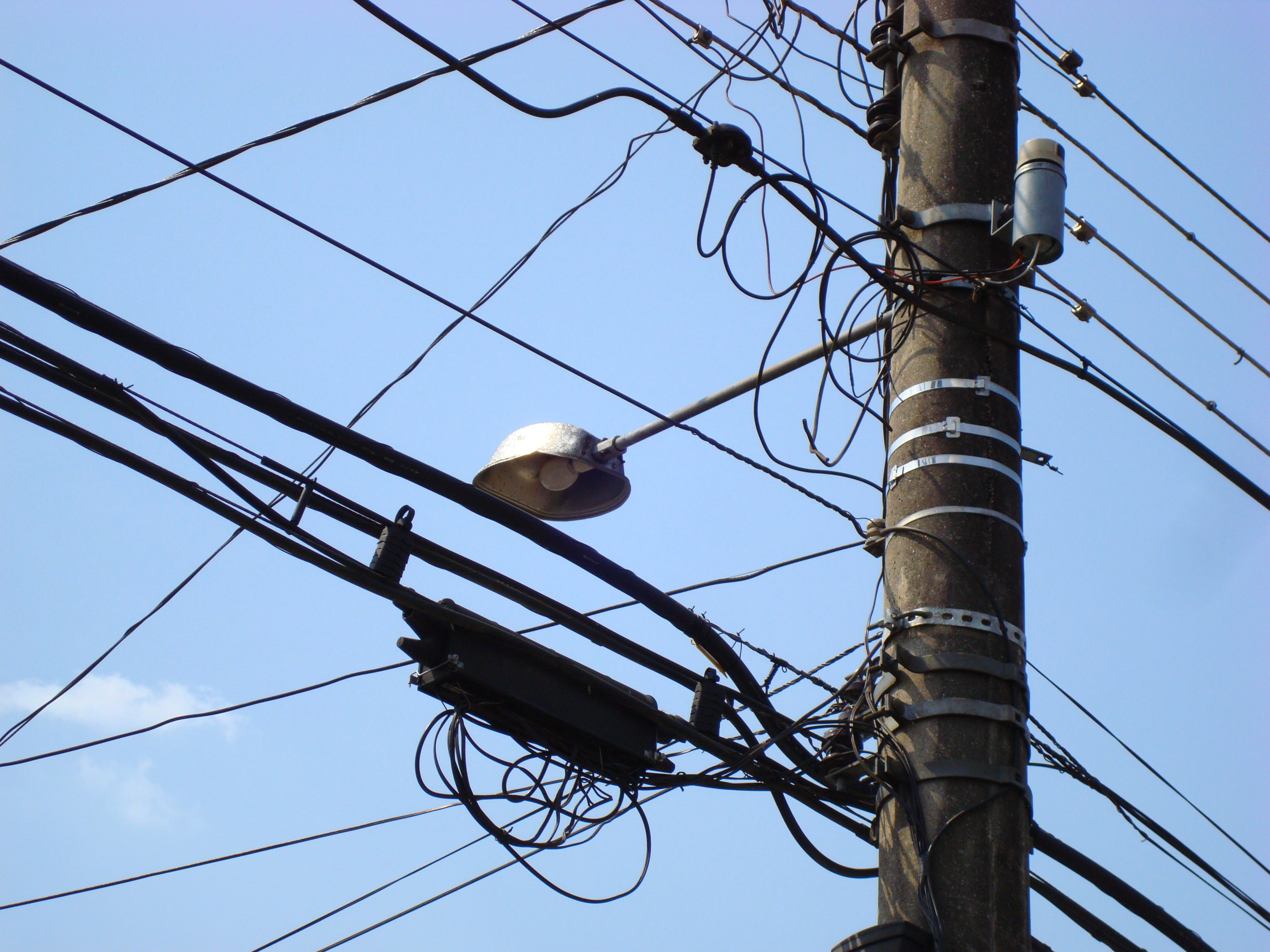
Utility pole shared by service providers

Telecom service providers can share infrastructure in many ways, depending on telecom regulatory and legislation.

- Passive infrastructure sharing is sharing non-electronic infrastructure at cell site. Passive Infrastructure is becoming popular in telecom industry worldwide.
  - Site sharing includes antennas and mast; this may also hold Base transceiver station (BTS), Node B in UMTS context and common equipment such as Antenna system, masts, cables, ducts, filters, power source and shelter.
  - Sharing a mast is called mast sharing.
  - Antenna sharing shares an antenna and all related connections (coupler, feeder cable), in addition to passive radio site elements.
- Active sharing is sharing electronic infrastructure.
- Spectrum-sharing (also called Frequency sharing) concept is based on a lease model and is often termed ‘spectrum trading’. An operator can lease a part of its spectrum to another operator on commercial terms. Though this mechanism, along with that of MVNOs, exists in the US, Europe, Singapore and Australia.
- Base station sharing is prospective while each operator maintains control over logical Node B so that it will be able to operate the frequencies assigned to the carrier, fully independent from the partner operator and retains control over active base station equipment such as the TRXs that control reception/transmission over radio channels. Radio network controller and core network are not shared here.
- Radio Network Controller (RNC) sharing represents maintaining logical control over the RNC of each operator independently.
- MSC and routers sharing or backbone sharing includes sharing switches (MSC) and routers (SGSN) on the operator's fixed network.
- Network sharing where a network infrastructure is created expressly for the purpose of sharing resources. For example, in Sweden 70% of the country is covered by a shared network built as a joint venture between Telenor Sweden (originally Vodafone Sweden) and HI3G (Hutcheson Investor). When a user is in one of the main cities his calls are carried by the native network infrastructure of Telenor or HI3G while outside the cities his call roams onto the shared network provided by 3GIS.
- Geographical splitting

== See also ==
- Unbundled access
