= Verbal identity =

Linguistic component of an organization's brand

Verbal identity or verbal brand identity is the linguistic component of an organisation's brand. It incorporates brand language, the terms in which an organisation describes itself and its products, but also covers the names of corporations and the products they sell, taglines, and the “voice” of the brand, defined as the personality and tone discernible in its communications. In conjunction with visual and sensory identity, it is a key component of overall brand identity.

Verbal identity has traditionally been considered subordinate to visual identity due to the monodirectional nature of conventional advertising. However, the increasing importance of a two-way conversation between brand and consumer, for instance that of social media, has led to a sharp rise in its prominence over the last decade. This ability to engage in an ongoing dialogue with customers provides an opportunity for companies to more firmly cement their products and services into the consumer consciousness, but doing so successfully requires a consistent, well-defined approach to the use of language.

== History ==
Verbal identity was originally defined by John Simmons, a writer and marketing consultant, while working at the brand strategy agency InterBrand The concept and strategies for its cultivation were developed to address a lack of coherent treatment within the advertising, marketing, and branding industries of the language used within brand implementation. The concept of positive verbal identity management has seen a rapid surge in popularity since it was first introduced to marketing in 2003. As of 2013, many larger agencies have begun to offer tailored verbal identity services to their clients, with a number of smaller boutique consultancies also emerging to cater for the increasingly high demand. In addition, since the concepts inherent to verbal identity creation and management have always been key skills in copywriting, a number of freelance copywriters have begun to reposition themselves as "verbal identity specialists". In 2016, the London International Awards introduced a verbal identity category where entries were judged upon their naming and tone of voice, among other linguistic qualities.

== Purpose ==
Verbal identity's primary function is to ensure that the language being used throughout a brand's communication channels is executed in a way which positively impacts the value of the brand. Properly implemented, verbal identity will also inform the language with which the organisation communicates internally. In this way, it will become a vital element of company culture which affects not only consumer perceptions, but the processes through which all aspects of a business are governed and broadcast.

== Development ==
Depending on their history and the circumstances under which they operate, companies may naturally develop a strong verbal brand identity over time. This can regularly occur in organisations which have grown to fit very specific niche markets, for instance technology, or in those situations where a particularly strong leadership exists. Conversely, companies may have trouble maintaining a cohesive verbal identity if they deliver a particularly broad range of products and services, or are extremely large and rely on heavily devolved corporate governance structures. The pre-existence of linguistic associations with the brand in a permanent form on social media outlets over which a brand exercises no control cannot be ignored, because a verbal identity which ignores this material will appear to be inauthentic or out of touch

In developing a verbal-identity strategy, companies should be willing to take stock of the consumer chatter surrounding both their own brand and the industry at large, which in the modern day is principally derived from social media. However, the huge quantities of data these platforms generate has traditionally represented a key barrier to producing worthwhile, in-depth analysis. The application of text analytics programs and techniques are therefore becoming a valuable methodology in the development of such strategies. Once sufficient data has been gathered from appropriate sources, it is necessary for the company to analyse the ways in which their industry speaks to both consumers and other businesses, its own language, and the language used by consumers when speaking of the business and wider industry. With this data available, it is possible to pinpoint the key words and phrases associated with the brand, and their connotations in the wider marketplace.

This information can then be used to construct a program for brand implementation through verbal identity, taking into account any current mismatch between brand and consumer language. This will include determining the precise vocabulary to be used in brand communication channels, the optimum names for products and services, and the brand's overall "voice". The "voice" of the brand can be defined as the personality associated with the brand in culture. Depending on what the company wishes to achieve in terms of its verbal identity, the company's voice can be calibrated to take on any style and tone it chooses. The way brands talk to customers is evolving, though, and the conversation needs to change depending on the audience and where it is taking place.

=== Narrative models ===
Strong verbal identity is often informed by the narrative models employed in the company's copy. Narrative modelling relies on the assumption that human beings frame their experiences in terms of various classes of "story", and the notion that people will respond more positively to a story which they can easily recognise and follow. Brands which are struggling to become known within their market can often benefit from a change in narrative model, without any alteration to the product or service. The optimum narrative model for any given brand can only be determined following a full "audit" of the brand's history and communications.

== Implementation and delivery ==
The most important aspect of verbal identity implementation is that consistency be maintained across all communication channels, both internal and external. Lack of internal consistency in verbal identity will generally lead to consumer confusion or dissatisfaction with the brand, and may even make a brand appear to be untrustworthy if allowed to go unchecked.

Verbal identity is delivered externally through official marketing channels, such as advertising, public relations, and social media. However, it should be evidenced in all situations where a company relies on language to communicate propositions or engage with an audience. This means that when properly implemented and delivered, a company's verbal identity will be reinforced through channels such as phone conversations, sales pitches, and recruitment drives undertaken on behalf of the company.

Verbal identity is also delivered internally in any situation in which language is being employed on a day-to-day basis, including presentations and meetings among staff at all levels, as well as company briefs, memos, and other official communications channels.

== Common problems ==
Because developing and maintaining a coherent verbal identity across an organisation requires a high degree of unified strategy, a number of problems may be encountered. For example, it will be nearly impossible to implement a sound strategy for verbal identity if communication channels within a business are unclear or disrupted. It will be similarly impossible to make meaningful advances if an analysis of the specific company and sector needs in the area has not been made. Organisations which are particularly fragmented or which rely on heavily devolved structures in their governance will also find verbal identity implementation difficult without clear lines of responsibility and authority.

== See also ==
- Brand equity
- Brand implementation
- Brand language
- Brand loyalty
- Branding agency
- Content marketing
- Emotional branding
- Integrated marketing communications
- Visual brand language

== Other Relevant Sources ==
http://www.warc.com

http://www.brandrepublic.com

Here Simmons argues not only for the power of words, but also for the power of storytelling - the ability to deliver a yarn eloquently to win hearts and minds, to coin a cliché. http://www.brandrepublic.com/news/176940/MARKETING-MIX-Book-week/?DCMP=ILC-SEARCH
