= Functional branding =

Functional Branding is a discipline within service design where services are created or improved to deliver more than enhanced user experience. Instead, services are created to deliver a branded experience to users through outstanding application of service design.

An example might be two competing websites that offer broadly the same products or services. Functional branding would enable one of these sites to differentiate itself through the interactions with users, positively reinforcing its brand values through design.

Every time a consumer interacts with a brand, an opportunity exists for their perceptions to be influenced. Functional branding aims to ensure that every interaction is a branded experience, so that users receive not only a positive experience but one that conveys the brand values of the company.

These user experiences will have more than excellent functionality and usability, they also appeal to consumers on an emotional level. Functional branding builds an overall and comprehensive branded experience, which can increase consumer brand loyalty and positively influence brand equity.

Functional branding is a new discipline within service design which is being practiced by a small number of service design companies.

== See also ==
- Service Design
- Brand
- Brand equity
- Brand loyalty
- Brand architecture
- Brand engagement
- Brand loyalty
- Brand management
- Brand orientation
- Integrated marketing communications*
- Branded Asset Management
- Visual brand language

== Bibliography ==
- Lawford, Catherine (2009) "Marketing in the Noughties: your brand is your product."
