= Digital branding =

Brand management technique

Digital branding is a brand management technique that uses a combination of internet branding and digital marketing to develop a brand over a range of digital venues, including internet-based relationships, device-based applications or media content.

== Concept ==
Digital branding aims to create connections between consumers and the products or service being delivered so that brand recognition is established in the digital world. In short, the goal of digital branding is not necessarily driving sales, but enhancing the awareness, image, and style of the brand. Digital branding in turn drives long-term customer loyalty.

Brand establishment involves four key points:

1. Building a digital brand story
2. Creativity in digital media and marketing
3. Digital channels and content distributed to channels based on consumer data and habits
4. Creating digital relationships.

== Digital impact on branding ==
Before the internet, information about companies and consumers was somewhat limited due to access to information, geographical separation, and lack of interaction. The existence of the internet and websites has therefore transformed branding: the internet has transformed interaction between brands and customers; and websites facilitate online marketing and sales, as well as collecting comprehensive data on customers.

Another impact on branding practices is the emergence of value co-creation as an alternative way to long-term customer relationships, customer loyalty, and eventual profitability. Joint effort is formed between the companies and customers during the various stages of the product. It strengthens the bond and builds loyalty and customer engagement.

== Digital branding channels ==
According to Mabbly CEO, Hank Ostholthoff, digital branding is facilitated by multiple channels. As an advertiser, one's core objective is to find channels that result in maximum two-way communication and a better overall return-of-investment for the brand.

There are multiple online marketing channels available, namely:

- New media marketing
- Cross-media marketing
- Retail media
- Affiliate marketing
- Display advertising
- Internet branding
  - Email marketing
  - Search marketing
  - Social media
  - Social networking
  - Online PR
- Game advertising
- Video advertising
- SMS marketing
- Branding on MetaVerse

== Measurement & Analytics ==
Measuring brand performance in digital environments has become an important area of both academic research and marketing practice. Traditional brand equity metrics are increasingly considered insufficient for capturing the complexity of digital consumer interactions. Effective digital brand measurement should incorporate constructs such as share of search, digital brand awareness and digital brand sentiment, alongside conventional tools such as consumer surveys and sales metrics.

== Personal digital branding ==
As social media platforms have been established and have evolved over the last couple of decades, digital branding has become personal. Individuals have taken to social media to brand and market themselves in building their personal and professional lives. Consequently, boundaries between the personal and professional are fading.

Those who participate in social media sites should be aware that their social media content is public and may be accessed by colleagues, clients, and other professional references. Many universities and workplaces have established social media policies. A well-curated social media presence may be attractive to employers, while poorly representing oneself is an employment liability.

== See also ==
- Brand engagement
- Brand implementation
- Brand management
- Online advertising
- Search engine results page
- Social media marketing
- Visual marketing
