= Brand aversion =

Brand aversion is an antonym of brand loyalty. It is a distrust or a dislike of products from a particular brand on the basis of experiences with that brand and its products, similar to taste aversion. Brand aversion, also called brand hate, can lead to brand avoidance, but it is not the same. Both with brand aversion and brand avoidance, the feelings towards the brand are negative. Only the difference is that the strength of those negative feelings/relationship towards the brand are weak with brand avoidance and strong with brand aversion. Moreover, experiencing brand aversion is more intense and stronger than experiencing brand dislike.

Brand aversion can be the effect of obtrusive marketing strategies, bad press, a mass product recall, or other poor product launches. Also, extrinsic factors like the price of a product, the availability, and a salesperson' recommendations are likely to influence a consumers' brand aversion. Before even interacting with a brand, consumers will always expect to be receiving fair outcomes and justice, and when a brand cannot deliver consumers' expectations or the promises they have made, the perceived injustice of consumers will increase rapidly. In other words, then the outcome of what the brand offers is repeatedly lower than the consumers' expectations, the consumer eventually will start feeling aversion toward the targeted brand and therefore also tries to distance themselves from the brand (brand avoidance).

Psychologically, the reasons for brand aversion have been explained by the attachment-aversion model using the same three dimensions ("3 Es") that characterize a product:

1. enticing/annoying the self
2. enabling/disabling the self and
3. enriching/impoverishing the self (benefits/liabilities).

The more annoying/disabling/impoverishing a brand "feels", the more aversion will be produced and vice versa. As is the case with all brands, the conceived qualities need neither correspond to real assets nor shortcomings.

There are three possible outcome behaviors when a consumer experiences brand aversion:

1. Brand avoidance (characterized by consumers distancing themselves from the brand they hate, because they do not want to have any type of interaction with the brand anymore)
2. Negative word of mouth (characterized by talking negatively about the brand, either in private to family and friends or in public on Websites or forums of the brand)
3. Brand revenge (characterized by complaining to employees of the brand, or literally destroying the brand by stealing products or damaging the store).

== See also ==
- Brand architecture
- Brand equity
- Brand management
- Customer engagement
- Employer branding
- Evangelism marketing
- Semiotics and globalization
