= Brand language =

Words and phrases used when marketing a product

Multiple visual elements contribute to the branding of the inauguration of Willem-Alexander ceremony in 2013

Brand language is the body of words, phrases, and terms that an organization uses to describe its purpose or in reference to its products. Brand language is used in marketing to help consumers connect specific words or ideas to specific companies or products. When developing a brand language, word choice and tone are the two fundamental components. Word choice is the vocabulary that is used in the marketing or advertising, while tone refers to the attitude of the advertisement. Tone is not limited to language, it can also be incorporated through visual elements as well as delivery.

Brand language is a part of verbal brand identity, includes naming of both corporation and the products they sell as well as taglines, idiosyncratic wording choices, and tone. Another benefit of developing a brand language is the ability for a corporation or product to be recognizable across international borders, while other advertising codes can be misinterpreted, words can be translated to ensure brand unity.

== Primary goal ==
As a part of the advertising world brand language's primary function is to identify a company or product and also differentiate that company/product from competitors. The language is used to get the attention of the consumer and then to relay information about what is being advertised. It is also used to ensure that when people communicate about the product there are fewer misunderstandings and more clarity about purpose and the role that this commodity wants to play in the lives of the consumer.

The brand language can also be associated with competing for investors, recruiting talent, or acquiring business partners.

Brand language is also often used internally within a company. For motivational and leadership situations, branding language helps to promote the brand values and is treated as a commodity alongside the actual products and/or company.

== Examples ==
When positive words become strongly associated with particular brands, these words can become assets—to the point that competing brands may find the words difficult to use. For example, in his book Brand Sense (Kogan Page, 2005) Martin Lindstrom quotes extensive word association research carried out by Millward Brown demonstrating the strong link between the words “magic” and “kingdom” and Disney. Disney appears to have made a successful investment in “owning” these words. Lindstrom’s studies found that Disney has the highest number of words that are associated with one specific brand (among brands that were surveyed). Along with “magic” and “kingdom” Disney has been shown to have branded the words: “dreams,” “creativity,” “fantasy,” “smiles” and “generation”. The study that he conducted asked people to associate those words with a brand and over 80% of people asked said that they thought of Disney. Part of the reason that Disney has been so successful is that they are able to seamlessly integrate traditional and new media markets in a way that allows them to reach large audiences with a stable continuous message.

Other campaigns that have powerful brand language recognition are Kellogg’s and Gillette. Part of the idea with branded language is to go beyond just a slogan and to imbue ordinary words with the idea or essence of a particular brand. With Kellogg’s the word that is associated with them is “crunch”. With Gillette the word that consumers see as synonymous with the brand is “masculine.” In this case the word masculine also conjures socially constructed ideologies, which helps the brand become a more stable construction in the mind of consumers.

The disadvantage of very strong brand language associations is that they may prove a hindrance if a brand wishes to position itself differently.

== Delivery channels ==
In Brand Sense, Lindstrom says brand language starts from the bottom up and “not suddenly placed on top like a piece of decorative icing”. So, as well as being competitive, brand language should be delivered as consistently as possible through all formal delivery channels.

With the expansion of social media, there is a new market for advertising and the use of branding language. Social media allows for companies to move beyond the more traditional forms of advertising and into a new arena. However, it is important that the language of the advertising remain consistent throughout a campaign no matter what the platform. Different social media sites offer various audiences and come with particular and differing platforms. Using the right language and jargon is important so that companies seem engaged and are able to spread their message to multiple audiences.

Brand recognition can inspire an influx of followers or friends, but if the social media content is seen as lacking then it can cause audiences to negatively perceive a company. When employing social media resources it is crucial that a company begin to view their “brand as a personality”. It is important for companies to know why they are using these social media sites – it might be education, a playful persona, or a desire to attract more people to an online store. Clarity of focus will allow companies to build their sites around this one particular point, which helps consumers recognize the brand and follow it. Knowing the purpose of the social media site also allows for the company to tailor the site to the specific needs of the commodity. Here tone becomes important as it allows for audiences to better understand how to engage with the site and through that, the company or product.

One of the facets that is unique to new media, and specifically social media, is the dialogue that is expected to take place between a company and the consumers. Unlike traditional marketing formats, which send information one way, social media enables immediate and direct feedback from a myriad of users. Many companies find that it challenging to “move from faceless corporation to friend”. Because of this some choose not to engage in social media or only do so marginally. Companies must be able to assess the brand attributes and translate that into a personality so that online users feel that they can form a relationship with these companies and products.

Brand language is delivered externally through formal marketing communications, such as advertising and public relations. It is present wherever written and spoken language is used to communicate a proposition. This includes recruitment, corporate communications, investor relations, sales presentations, conference speaking, retail staff and whenever an individual answers the telephone on behalf of the brand.

Internally, brand language is delivered primarily through internal presentations, staff conferences and through intranet sites.

Because brand language is so widespread, it has many internal and external contributors. This diversity of sources and contributors makes it very difficult to control. Visual identity is produced from a central source, usually a design agency. It is usually delivered with a set of design guidelines produced to ensure the consistent delivery of design. Variations from these guidelines can be identified relatively easily by the brand’s managers. This is much more difficult with language.

== Areas and authorities that offer brand language ==
=== Brand agencies ===
Brand design agencies have diversified beyond their roots in brand logo and packaging design into corporate identity and brand language. They are global businesses with the scope to ensure that brand naming and brand language works in different languages.

=== Specialist brand language consultancies ===
Since the early 2000s, a few specialist brand language consultancies (also known as tone of voice or verbal branding consultancies) have emerged. Among the best-known are:

- Reed Words: London and New York City, established 2013. All varieties of brand language, for clients including Google, Premier League, McDonald’s and Zoox. Reed Words is also a B Corp
- True & Good: UK, launched in 2011 under the name Tone of Voice Limited, and works with brands including Boodles, Quooker and UK Sport.
- We All Need Words: launched in London in 2010
- Noted: a brand storytelling agency based in the US
- Verbal Identity: launched in the UK in 2010

=== Digital and social media companies ===
Brands are tracking social media in order to understand how people are talking about them. The corollary is that they contribute to how brands are talking about themselves.

=== Brand writers ===
This new emphasis on brand language has led to the emergence of a new breed of writers - these are a hybrid of brand consultant and word expert, with a good dose of consumer psychology and change management know-how in the mix. This new breed are brand writers - the kind of people who can take corporate and brand strategy and create a style of communication that supports and accelerates those business goals.

=== Copywriters ===
There are large numbers of freelance copywriters that have repositioned themselves as brand language experts.

== Political uses ==
Brand language is a strategy that has been used to further political agendas and campaigns. In his book Language and Politics, Noam Chomsky makes the argument that language is used to shape the way in which political events and people are seen and remembered. He views this practice as mostly negative and believes that politicians reword events to cover failed actions.

More recently campaigns have made concerted efforts to brand certain language in an effort to have constituents link phrases and ideas with a particular candidate or political party. There are two ways of exploring brand language as it relates to politics. One way is to research the key positive and negative traits voters look for on candidates and then ask which of these seems linked to one candidate or the other. This examines the way in which political strategists position their candidates and how much of the message is getting across and which audiences are most responsive to them. Another way of examining brand language in politics is to look at the actual words that the candidates say in order to determine their branding of language. Brooklyn Art Project compiled a list of the most commonly used words during the 2008 presidential campaign and made a visual representation of them to showcase how each candidate branded certain words.

== See also ==
- Brand architecture
- Brand equity
- Brand implementation
- Brand loyalty
- Branding agency
- Content marketing
- Integrated marketing communications
- Visual brand language
- Emotional branding
