= Brand implementation =

In marketing, brand implementation refers to the physical representation and consistent application of brand identity across visual and verbal media. In visual terms, this can include signage, uniforms, liveries, interior design and branded merchandise. Brand implementation encompasses facets of architecture, product design, industrial design, quantity surveying, engineering, procurement, project management and retail design.

Brand implementation is an integrated part of a branding cycle and needs to be initiated during the brand design and development phase. Brand implementation is the continuous and consistent application of the brand's image in all business units, communication channels and media.

This refers to marketing and branding as a unified whole. In that respect, brand implementation is a continuous process, which requires controlling the brand's image and presence despite changes in markets and company structure.

== Background ==
Brand implementation emerged as a discipline in the 1990s when brand owners recognized the need for consistency across branded estates. Traditionally, brand implementation was handled by various parties, including shop-fitters, interior designers and sign companies. Lack of centralized project management led to inconsistencies, while information dissymmetry meant suppliers had too much control over brand issues. Brand implementation was consequently coined as an umbrella term for all aspects of the application and maintenance of physical brand assets.

== Key problem fields ==
The experience of more than 80 companies operating worldwide shows that a lack of planning before the rebrand, consistent implementation and complete control are the key problems of brand implementation. Eight large stumbling blocks stand in the way of effective implementation:

- Inadequate communication
- No situation and needs analysis
- Lack of consequence
- Undefined processes
- Fragmented (organizational) structures.
- Organisations not considering all touchpoints
- No localisation strategy
- Absence of brand management strategy

== Magic and Logic ==
Brand implementation does not involve the design or creation of brand identity; brand implementation agencies work closely with branding agencies to ensure that their work is applied accurately and consistently. This relationship is referred to as Magic and Logic (RTM of Marketing Supply Chain International). Branding agencies look after the Magic (creative) and brand implementation agencies look after the Logic (implementation).

== See also ==
- Brand architecture
- Brand community
- Brand engagement
- Brand loyalty
- Brand orientation
- Branded asset management
- Employer branding
- Integrated marketing communications
- Visual merchandising
