= SocioBranding =

SocioBranding is an approach to brand management that integrates traditional advertising creative strategy and tactics with social networking websites, with the aim of being able to target potential customers more accurately.
