= Trevelino/Keller =

Trevelino/Keller Communications Group
- Company type: Private company
- Industry: Public relations
- Founded: 2003; 23 years ago
- Headquarters: Atlanta, Georgia, United States
- Area served: Southeastern United States
- Key people: Dean Trevelino (Principal), Genna Keller (Principal)
- Products: Public relations, FirstGear, FRAN-ADE, SocialStatus
- Website: www.trevelinokeller.com

Trevelino/Keller is an American public relations firm based in Atlanta. The firm has four practices: Progressive Technologies, Consumer Lifestyle, Business-to-Business, and GreenWorks.

== History ==
Dean Trevelino and Genna Keller, long-standing partners from the 1990s who met at Shandwick and 1999–2003 where they realigned at Ogilvy, started Trevelino/Keller in 2003. The firm concentrates on emerging and established companies based in the Southeast with a national or international footprint.

== Atlas Alliance ==
The Atlas Alliance is a consortium of boutique agencies started in 2005 by Trevelino/Keller. The alliance consists of UK-based The Word Shop, Atlanta-based Lanza Group, Dubai-based Active PR, Los Angeles-based Platform Media Group and Singapore-based Mileage Communications.

== Start-Up Council ==
The Start-Up Council was created in 2006 by Trevelino/Keller as a gratis-based initiative to support start-up companies in need of early stage counsel. Led by Trevelino/Keller, the counsel consists of consultants representing public relations, marketing, branding, financial services, human resources, outsourced manufacturing, venture capital, business strategy and legal. Start-up Council is hosted quarterly by Trevelino/Keller.
