= Branding agency =

Firm specializing in rebranding and creating and launching brands

A branding agency is a firm that specializes in creating and launching brands and rebranding. The role of a branding agency is to create, plan, measure, and manage branding strategies for clients, including support in advertising and other forms of promotion.

Branding is the process of developing a company's brand, including name, identity system, brand architecture, and messaging platform. These aspects will lead to the development of a "brand message", applied to marketing campaigns. A brand represents a promise to the customer, reflecting the expectations they can have from the products and services offered, as well as the offering difference amongst the competitors.

A branding agency allows organizations to gain a competitive advantage, to define a coherent brand communication strategy, and to reach the target market and expand it.

== Branding agencies vs advertising agencies ==
Although branding agencies and advertising agencies overlap in some aspects, they have different scopes and focus. Branding agencies typically define and manage brand strategy to shape long-term perceptions and guide how a brand is expressed across touchpoints. Advertising agencies are generally tasked with creating and placing paid communications, planning and buying media, and executing time-bound campaigns aimed at specific communication objectives.

In practice, branding agencies tend to focus on the strategic and foundational aspects of a brand, such as articulating brand purpose and values, establishing brand architecture and producing guidelines that determine how the brand should look, sound and behave across touchpoints. Advertising agencies more commonly work with these foundations to develop specific campaigns, creative concepts and messages aimed at short- to medium-term objectives such as awareness, lead generation or sales, using channels such as television, digital, print and outdoor. The two functions are complementary within integrated marketing communications, where consistent brand platforms support more effective campaign execution and brand equity outcomes.Many large agencies and holding companies now offer both branding and advertising services under one roof, blurring organisational boundaries while maintaining the conceptual distinction between brand-building and campaign execution.

== Leading brands and the role of branding agencies ==
The evolving economy with increasingly competitive markets is creating a greater stress on developing brands that aim at being widely recognized by the public.

=== Leading brands: Coca-Cola ===
Coca-Cola is globally considered as one of the most successful and recognized brand. A survey conducted by Interbrand, an American branding consultancy, found that Coca-Cola's brand equity was valued at $63.5 billion, representing just under half of the company's true market value. An executive at Coca-Cola stated, "If Coca-Cola were to lose all of its production-related assets in a disaster, the company would survive. By contrast, if all consumers were to have a sudden lapse of memory and forget everything related to Coca-Cola, the company would go out of business."

Coca-Cola has collaborated with a number of branding agencies over the years. Most recently, in the light of a new global campaign, Coca-Cola has partnered with ten agencies (including WPP, Wieden+Kennedy and McCann) with the aim, as a Coca-Cola spokesperson stated, "of uncovering the best ideas and marrying those to executional excellence". The spokesperson added, "this approach allows us to harness thinking from some of the best agency minds in the industry and see the great work that comes from collaborating". The statement acknowledges the collaborative and creative process involved in brand management, which is generally an integral concept involved in branding.

Even the most successful brands will seek branding support. This will often be more focused on specific areas, and in particular those related to reaching, attracting and retaining the target market.

=== Changing trends: Apple ===
Apple Logo

Despite having headed Interbrand's list of the 100 most valuable brands for 13 consecutive years, Coca-Cola was replaced by Apple, reflecting a wider shift trend towards the brand strength of technology companies. Three of the top five most valuable brands are technology companies.

This data stresses another key element that must be addressed by branding agencies: the value of innovation and the need to exploit trends. The rise of the technology domain has resulted in the emergence of new channels, such as Facebook, Instagram, Google and Twitter.

This change in trends results in new approaches to branding. Agencies must be naturally innovative and flexible in order to survive a fast-paced environment. With branding becoming an increasingly vital element to a firm's success, many organizations believe it is in their best interest to seek external support.

==== Interbrand's Ranking of the 5 Most Valuable Brands (2015) ====
Rank	Brand	Region/Country	Sector	Brand Value (in $m)	Change in Brand Value (in %)
1		United States	Technology	170,276	+43
2		United States	Technology	120,314	+12
3		United States	Beverages	78,423	-4
4		United States	Technology	67,670	+11
5		United States	Business Services	65,095	-10
