= Customer franchise =

A customer franchise refers to the cumulative image of a product, held by the consumer, resulting from long exposure to the product or marketing of the product.

== Overview ==
One of the most positive ways of consolidating the consumer as the most important focus of the organisation is to look on this relationship as a prime asset of the business; one that has been built up by a series of marketing investments over the years. As with any other asset, this investment can be expected to bring returns over subsequent years. On the other hand, also like any other asset, it has to be protected and husbanded. This 'asset' is often referred to as the customer franchise creating satisfaction.

At one extreme it may come from the individual relationship developed face to face by the sales professional. At the other it is the cumulative image, held by the consumer, resulting from long exposure to all aspects of the product or service, and especially to a number of advertising and promotional campaigns. In some markets the customer franchise may be so strong as to be exclusive; in effect giving the supplier a monopoly with those customers.

Even though, Andrew Ehrenberg's work on brand portfolios has shown that consumers may regularly switch brands – for variety – they may still retain an image of the brand; which will swing the balance when their next purchase decision is taken. It may thus still have a value (upon which the advertiser can build) even if the current purchasing decision goes against it. A later decision may, once again, swing in its favour. Even though it is intangible, the customer franchise is an asset in terms of its potential effect on sales.

== Cumulative impact ==
It is based, though, on an accumulation of impacts over time. Unfortunately, too many marketers – particularly those in creative departments within advertising agencies – signally fail to recognise the importance, and long-term nature, of this investment. They treat each new campaign as if it could, and should, be taken in isolation - no matter how it meshes with previous messages which have been delivered to the consumer. The evidence is that the consumer, on the other hand, does not view the advertising and promotion in such lofty isolation; instead he or she incorporates it into their existing image - to good or bad effect, depending upon how well the new campaign complements the old.

== Brand franchise ==
The customer franchise is, to all practical intents, the external alter ego of the brand, and hence can be seen as the mirror image of the brand franchise. The brand is how the producer typically sees the (internal) investment. The customer franchise is the outcome of that internal investment; the counterbalancing entry with the customers.

== See also ==
- Brand loyalty
