= Internet branding =

Brand management technique

Internet branding (also referred to as online branding) is a brand management technique that uses the World Wide Web & Social Media Channels as a medium for positioning a brand in the marketplace. Branding is increasingly important with the advancements of the internet. Most businesses are exploring various online channels, which include search engine, social media, online press releases, online marketplace, to establish strong relationships with consumers and to build their brands awareness.

== Online branding techniques ==
Some professionals believe that the goal of online branding is to increase brand recognition. Others focus on integrating online branding with the overall brand experience of customers in relation to a company, product, or other branded entity. From this perspective, brand recognition is viewed as one component among many, such as brand differentiation (from competitors) and the "Collaboration Age" brand dialog facilitated by Internet and mobile communications. Website development is a key component of online branding as a website is used by companies and individuals to present products and services of a brand. Focusing on a website's appearance, functions, and company message to provide a positive experience to visitors is all part of online branding. Website development for online branding also includes utilizing a blog to generate content for readers interested in topics related to the brand. It has been both recommended and advised against to guest blog on other websites for the purpose of online branding. In 2014, Matt Cutts, the head of Google's Spam team, stated that guest blogging has become more and more spammy and recommended against using guest posting for building incoming links to a website.

Internet branding also involves social media interaction and integration. Display and content networks used with repetition are one method of integrating a brand with social media. Behavioral targeting, re-messaging, and site-specific targeting are used as a way to keep a brand in front of a target audience. Branding through social media involves sharing knowledge about the brand and continuously interacting with customers.

== Advantages ==
=== Strengthening the customer relationship ===
The Internet is seen as a powerful branding tool for many businesses, as it offers ways to promote a business. Interactivity on the Internet can help companies communicate the brand messages quickly and talk to consumers directly. Consumers' potential purchasing behaviours may be influenced by brand knowledge and familiarity, so good online branding may help establish closer customer connections with brands and strengthen customer loyalty.

=== Developing brand alliances ===
Online branding involves different brand positioning and marketing strategies, which can not only differentiate separately branded products but also bring together endorser brands. For example, Library Websites are a prime example of such linking between the university website and other database or publisher websites such as FirstSearch and SpringerLink. In the new economy with the convergence of technology, online branding provides the opportunity for companies to develop brands alliances and networks to maximize the brand influence.

=== Diversifying the brand meaning ===
Online branding makes the company have the chance to communicate with customers directly and also provides the opportunity to gather customer information to build a database of customer purchase patterns. The data can be used to segment customers into specific groups with specific needs, even offer customized services. Therefore, the customization and targeting to smaller groups may generate the diversity of experience with the same brand. The same brands have different meanings for different groups of customer.

=== Measuring opportunities ===
In the realm of online branding, the ability to measure success surpasses that of offline brands. Digital analytics systems make it significantly easier for marketers to quantify the impact of their online brand. Through these digital analytics tools, marketers can assess how many individuals engaged with the brand online, understand their reactions, and evaluate memorability, among other metrics.

== Challenges ==
=== Information overload ===
The Web is a complicated place, it holds a vast number of websites, each of which has numerous information contained within it. It is an open place for every business, and how to differentiate brand image through the same communicate channels is a challenge for many companies, especially for those that customers have little brand knowledge about them before they implement online branding strategy. Failed cases usually underestimate either the complexity or the connectivity of the web.

=== Management of different communication channels ===
Online branding, in general, will cover most popular social media platforms with different websites or mobile applications. Companies need to make sure the consistency of the branding content across these channels.

In addition, it is also a challenge for the company to find and solve the complaint comments on brands in time, minimizing the negative effect.

== Ethics problems ==
Online brands are exposed to scrutiny from consumers through various review and complaint websites with fake reviews being used to damage brands. In 2014, a restaurant owner in Enid, Oklahoma refused to serve a patron in a wheelchair. In an interview, the owner stated that he does not serve "freaks" and made prejudiced remarks about homosexuality. Within days of the interview, people left fake reviews on Yelp about the restaurant in what the media described as "online justice." Social media is also used as a medium for people to leave fake reviews or defame brands. A hotel owner in the United Kingdom won a defamation lawsuit in 2014 against a former employee who set up a Facebook page solely for the purpose of damaging the inn's online brand.

Companies have also manipulated brands by leaving positive online reviews. In September 2013, 19 New York businesses agreed to pay $350,000 in penalties and stop writing faking online reviews about their businesses in an agreement reached with the New York Attorney General. The same year, Yelp sued a lawyer from San Diego for writing fake reviews about his solo practice on the site. Yelp has also posted messages on company pages within its site that have been caught paying for positive reviews. This was after the site conducted a sting operation on Craigslist to find companies paying for reviews. It has been argued that companies posting fake online reviews about their own business violates false advertising laws. United States law requires that people who receive compensation for endorsing a product actually endorse it. The company Legacy Learning Systems was fined $250,000 in 2011 by the U.S. Federal Trade Commission for paying people to post fake reviews.

== See also ==
- Personal branding
- Brand implementation
- Email marketing
- Internet celebrity
