= Threaded marketing =

The term Integrated Marketing Communications refers specifically to the connectivity of all communications about a brand in the marketplace - its packaging, media, in-store, website, etc.

Threaded Marketing goes beyond integrated marketing and refers to the process of carefully connecting all aspects of a product or service from the targeted consumer back through the delivery channels and into the manufacturer. This broader definition adds threads of consistency through the actual product or service, the type of channels used, the Customer Service team in the manufacturer and even the Mission and Values of the manufacturing company itself. These efforts are most successful when applied consistently over several years.

True threaded marketing efforts strengthen a brand in the marketplace and build a much stronger connectivity between the consumer, brand and company. Product quality and consistency is generally better, and consumers develop stronger preferences for the brand over time. This stronger brand equity pays off for the brand through higher profitability and market value.
