= Faith branding =

Faith branding or religious branding is the concept of branding religious organizations, leaders, or media programming, in the hope of penetrating a media-driven, consumer-oriented culture more effectively. Faith branding treats faith as a product and attempts to apply the principles of marketing in order to "sell" the product. Faith branding is a response to the challenge that religious organizations and leaders face regarding how to express their faith in a media-dominated culture.

== The Rise of Faith Branding ==
Traditionally, religious “brands” were various denominations of that religion but in the twenty-first century, churches advertise to the general market in the same way as any other organization or company. These strategies include the use of billboards, books, and television. Creating a brand for faith may be needed as religions each promise the same general end benefit or the idea of salvation, peace of mind, and comfort through belief and to differentiate from other religious groups, religions must create an appeal through symbols and messaging. Some groups even use traditional door-to-door sales tactics to gain members such as the Jehovah's Witnesses.

In the 2010s, religious marketing had risen substantially over the past two decades due to a confluence of societal changes. In 2003, religious publishing and products had a $6.8 billion market value in sales and grew at a rate of close to five percent each year. The market considered included three categories: books ($3.5 billion in sales and 7 percent growth rate); stationary/giftware/ merchandise ($1.4 billion and 4.5 percent growth rate); and audio/ video/software ($1.4 billion in sales and flat growth). Walmart, sold more than $1 billion in Christian books and music and stated they are “looking at this as a huge opportunity for the future” demonstrating how secular organizations understand the revenue and sales opportunities associated with religiously oriented sales.

When churches employ the principles of emphasizing and communicating authenticity, enhancing interactive marketing strategies, integration of faith-based elements in marketing campaigns, reevaluating the role of inclusivity, and conducting continued research and adaptation, these religious groups are most successful. Groups that appropriately assess and evaluate the target audience gain the most numerous and the most long-term membership.

== Examples of Faith Branding ==
- The Passion of the Christ: A film produced in 2004 that depicts the crucifixion of Jesus Christ. The film was viewed on a wide scale and was promoted and endorsed by many Christian denominations. The film was popularized as a tool to recruit members to churches.
- The Church of Scientology: A religious group often described as a cult uses many traditional sales tactics including using flyers, tabling, and hosting workshops to gain membership. The church also promotes its celebrity membership to draw in new members.
- The United Methodist Church: A church with a district logo featuring a black cross and red flame. The church has entire webpages dedicated to fonts, graphics, and marketing strategy demonstrating its commitment to consistent messaging.
