= Individual branding =

Individual branding, also called individual product branding, flanker brands or multibranding, is "a branding strategy in which products are given brand names that are newly created and generally not connected to names of existing brands offered by the company." Each brand, even within a same company, has a unique name, identity and image, allowing the company to target different market segments, tailor pricing and marketing strategies, and separate the image and reputation of different products.

Individual branding contrasts with umbrella branding and corporate branding, in which the firm markets all of its product together, using the same brand name and identity.

== Applicability ==
Individual branding is the most effective when a company offers numerous unconnected commodities, which vary in quality and price and target different market segments. It is also useful when introducing a new, high-risk product to the market, in order to manage risks to existing brands if the new product should fail. However, the expected revenue from a new brand must justify the higher costs of marketing and advertising.

== Advantages ==
- Reduced corporate identity attached to a product allows brands to be positioned differently, so that product brand isn't connected with the company brand;
- Each brand can use different marketing strategies;
- Brand separation allows a wider variety of products of different quality to be offered: lower-quality products under their own brand will not weaken the image of higher-quality products;
- Each brand can serve consumers in a different way, i.e. brands can work on different markets or appeal to different consumers aims, wishes and so-called 'pains';
- The company's global reputation is not tied to products: the failure of one product will not affect the company's global reputation.

== Disadvantages ==
- Instability within a company can occur because of competition between its brands;
- Multiple brands may divide the market and split efforts within one company;
- Risk of undesired market cannibalism;
- Brand creation incurs a high cost in marketing, advertising and sales promotion;
- Launching new products as their own brand is higher risk: new brands lack acknowledgement and customer loyalty and need to find recognition.

== Examples ==
=== Procter & Gamble ===
The American-based Procter & Gamble is the world's second largest FMCG company (2019). They have a portfolio of 65 brand overall, mostly in the domain of personal and household care. Examples of their brands include:

The company has the portfolio of the following categories:

- Beauty & grooming: Always, Gilette, Head & Shoulders, Herbal Essences, Lacoste fragrances, Max Factor, Old Spice, Oral-B, Pantene, Tampax
- Household care: Ace, Ambi Pur, Ariel, Lenor, Fairy Liquid, Pampers

In 2014, 21 brands had annual sales of $1 billion to about $10 billion, and 11 with sales of $500 million to $1 billion. The global annual sales of the company was $83 billion in 2014.

=== Unilever ===
The British-Dutch consumer goods company Unilever operates in 190 countries worldwide. The company has a portfolio that includes the following categories and brands:

- Food and drink: Flora, Algida, Hellmann's, Knorr, Lipton, Magnum, Ben&Jerry's, Carte D'or, Cornetto, Cremissimo, I Can't Believe It's Not Butter, Rama, Bertolli
- Home care: Domestos, Surf, Cajoline, Cif, Persil, Comfort
- Personal care: Axe, Dove, Lux, Rexona, Signal,
- Water purifier: Pureit

Of the company's 400 brands, 14 have a yearly profit of over €1 billion, while the global yearly turnover of the company was €48.4 billion in 2014.

== See also ==
- Branding strategies
  - Corporate branding
  - Umbrella brand
- Brand architecture
- Brand management
- Marketing
