= Corporate branding =

Practice of promoting a brand name of a corporation rather than its products

In marketing, corporate branding refers to the practice of promoting the brand name of a corporate entity, as opposed to specific products or services. The activities and thinking that go into corporate branding are different from product and service branding because the scope of a corporate brand is typically much broader. Although corporate branding is a distinct activity from product or service branding, these different forms of branding can, and often do, take place side-by-side within a given corporation. The ways in which corporate brands and other brands interact is known as the corporate brand architecture.

Corporate branding affects multiple stakeholders (e.g., employees, investors) and impacts many aspects of companies such as the evaluation of their product and services, corporate identity and culture, sponsorship, employment applications, and brand extensions (see study Fetscherin and Usunier, 2012). It therefore can result in significant economies of scope since one advertising campaign can be used for several products. It also facilitates new product acceptance because potential buyers are already familiar with the name. However, this strategy may hinder the creation of distinct brand images or identities for different products: an overarching corporate brand reduces the ability to position a brand with an individual identity, and may conceal different products' unique characteristics.

Corporate branding is not limited to a specific mark or name. Branding can incorporate multiple touchpoints. These touchpoints include; logo, customer service, treatment and training of employees, packaging, advertising, stationery, and quality of products and services. Any means by which the general public comes into contact with a specific brand constitutes a touchpoint that can affect perceptions of the corporate brand. Corporate branding can also be viewed from several approaches, including critical perspectives.

It has been argued that successful corporate branding often stems from a strong coherence between what the company's top management seek to accomplish (their strategic vision), what the company's employees know and believe (lodged in its organizational culture), and how its external stakeholders perceived the company (their image of it). Misalignments between these three factors, may indicate an underperforming corporate brand. This type of corporate brand analysis has been labeled the Vision-Culture-Image (VCI) Alignment Model.

Changes in stakeholder expectations are causing an increasing number of corporations to integrate marketing, communications and corporate social responsibility into corporate branding. This trend is evident in campaigns such as IBM Smarter Planet, G.E. Ecomagination, The Coca-Cola Company Live Positively, and DOW Human Element. As never before, people care about the corporation behind the product. They do not separate their opinions about the company from their opinions of that company's products or services. This blending of corporate and product/service opinions is due to increasing corporate transparency, which gives stakeholders a deeper, clearer view into a corporation's actual behavior and actual performance. Transparency is, in part, a byproduct of the digital revolution, which has enabled stakeholders—employees, retirees, customers, business partners, supply chain partners, investors, neighbors—with the ability to share opinion about corporations via social media.

== Top 10 most valuable brands ==
According to Forbes, these are the world's highest ranking brands as of 2021:

1. Apple - $241.2 B
2. Google - $207.5 B
3. Microsoft - $162.9 B
4. Amazon - $135.4 B
5. Facebook - $70.3 B
6. Coca-Cola - $64.4 B
7. Disney - $61.3 B
8. Samsung - $50.4 B
9. Louis Vuitton - $47.2 B
10. McDonald's - $46.1 B

== See also ==
- Brand architecture
- Corporate identity
- Corporate image
- Corporate social responsibility
- Brand management
- Brand orientation
- Brand
- Employer branding
- Family branding
- Individual branding
- Marketing
- Trademark
- Umbrella brand
