= Branded asset management =

Marketing process

Branded asset management refers to the implementation of brand modifications and life-cycle management of branded assets. These branded assets include media, products and other items which feature an organization or other brand.

== Background ==
Branding began to be a top management priority in the early 2000s due to the growing realization that a brand is one of the important assets that a firm can have. A brand is more than just a name on a stationery, clothes, plant, or equipment. It carries meaning to all stakeholders and represents a set of values, and even a personality of its own.

The goal of many corporations today is to create consistency and impact, both of which are a lot easier to manage with the concept of a global brand that offers a single worldwide identity. Branding and brand management strategies are efficient approaches as they can be employed globally. However, global marketing and increased competition have added pressure to the brand management structure. Today's marketplace is cluttered with hundreds of brands that strive to seize the attention of consumers.
