= Brand equity =

Marketing term

Brand equity, in marketing, is the worth of a brand in and of itself – i.e., the social value of a well-known brand name. The owner of a well-known brand name can generate more revenue simply from brand recognition, as consumers perceive the products of well-known brands as better than those of lesser-known brands.

In the research literature, brand equity has been studied from two different perspectives: cognitive psychology and information economics. According to cognitive psychology, brand equity lies in consumer's awareness of brand features and associations, which drive attribute perceptions. According to information economics, a strong brand name works as a credible signal of product quality for imperfectly informed buyers and generates price premiums as a form of return to branding investments. It has been empirically demonstrated that brand equity plays an important role in the determination of price structure and, in particular, firms are able to charge price premiums that derive from brand equity after controlling for observed product differentiation.

== The brand equity concept ==
It has been said that brand equity is "the branding of a product name on an attention-deficit public."

While most brand equity research has taken place in consumer markets, the concept of brand equity is also important for understanding competitive dynamics and price structures of business-to-business markets. In industrial markets competition is often based on differences in product performance. It has been suggested however that firms may charge premiums that cannot be solely explained in terms of technological superiority and performance-related advantages. Such price premiums reflect the brand equity of reputable manufacturers. Three brand equity drivers were selected by researchers from numerous factors that have impact on a brand: brand awareness, brand perspective, and brand attachment.

Brand equity is strategically crucial, but famously difficult to quantify. Many experts have developed tools to analyze this asset, but there is no agreed way to measure it. As one of the serial challenges that marketing professionals and academics find with the concept of brand equity, the disconnect between quantitative and qualitative equity values is difficult to reconcile. Quantitative brand equity includes numerical values such as profit margins and market share, but fails to capture qualitative elements such as prestige and associations of interest. Overall, most marketing practitioners take a more qualitative approach to brand equity because of this challenge. In a survey of nearly 200 senior marketing managers, only 26 percent responded that they found the "brand equity" metric very useful.

Some marketing researchers have concluded that brands are one of the most valuable assets a company has, as brand equity is one of the factors which can increase the financial value of a brand to the brand owner, although not the only one. Elements that can be included in the valuation of brand equity include (but not limited to): changing market share, profit margins, consumer recognition of logos and other visual elements, brand language associations made by consumers, consumers' perceptions of quality and other relevant brand values.

Consumers' knowledge about a brand also governs how manufacturers and advertisers market the brand. Brand equity is created through strategic investments in communication channels and market education and appreciates through economic growth in profit margins, market share, prestige value, and critical associations. Generally, these strategic investments appreciate over time to deliver a return on investment. This is directly related to marketing ROI. Brand equity can also appreciate without strategic direction. A Stockholm University study in 2011 documents the case of Jerusalem's city brand. The city organically developed a brand, which experienced tremendous brand equity appreciation over the course of centuries through non-strategic activities. A booming tourism industry in Jerusalem has been the most evident indicator of a strong ROI.

== Purpose ==
The purpose of brand equity metrics is to measure the value of a brand. A brand encompasses the name, logo, image, and perceptions that identify a product, service, or provider in the minds of customers. It takes shape in advertising, packaging, and other marketing communications, and becomes a focus of the relationship with consumers. In time, a brand comes to embody a promise about the goods it identifies—a promise about quality, performance, or other dimensions of value, which can influence consumers' choices among competing products. When consumers trust a brand and find it relevant, they may select the offerings associated with that brand over those of competitors, even at a premium price. When a brand's promise extends beyond a particular product, its owner may leverage it to enter new markets. For all these reasons, a brand can hold tremendous value, which is known as brand equity.

Social media has changed the traditional communication between brands and consumers and enabled consumer to make positive as well as negative influence on brand equity.

Brand Equity is best managed with the development of brand equity goals, which are then used to track progress and performance.

== Construction ==
There are many ways to measure a brand. Some measurements approaches are at the firm level, some at the product level and still others are at the consumer level.

Firm Level: Firm level approaches measure the brand as a financial asset. In short, a calculation is made regarding how much the brand is worth as an intangible asset. For example, if you were to take the value of the firm, as derived by its market capitalization—and then subtract tangible assets and "measurable" intangible assets—the residual would be the brand equity. Measuring brand equity in this way is often referred to as brand valuation. The modeling is closely related to brand equity, and a number of models and approaches have been developed by different consultancies. Brand valuation models typically combine a brand equity measure (e.g.: the proportion of sales contributed by "brand") with commercial metrics such as revenue or economic profit.

Product Level: The classic product level brand measurement example is to compare the price of a no-name or private label product to an "equivalent" branded product. The difference in price, assuming all things equal, is due to the brand. More recently a revenue premium approach has been advocated. Marketing mix modeling can isolate "base" and "incremental" sales, and it is sometimes argued that base sales approximate to a measure of brand equity. More sophisticated marketing mix models have a floating base that can capture changes in underlying brand equity for a product over time.

Consumer Level: This approach seeks to map the mind of the consumer to find out what associations with the brand the consumer has. This approach seeks to measure the awareness (recall and recognition) and brand image (the overall associations that the brand has). Free association tests and projective techniques are commonly used to uncover the tangible and intangible attributes, attitudes, and intentions about a brand. Brands with high levels of awareness and strong, favorable and unique associations are high equity brands.

All of these calculations are, at best, approximations. A more complete understanding of the brand can occur if multiple measures are used.

=== Positive brand equity vs. negative brand equity ===
Brand equity is the positive effect of the brand on the difference between the prices that the consumer accepts to pay when the brand is known compared to the value of the benefit received.

There are two schools of thought regarding the existence of negative brand equity. One perspective states brand equity cannot be negative, hypothesizing only positive brand equity is created by marketing activities such as advertising, PR, and promotion. A second perspective is that negative equity can exist, due to catastrophic events to the brand, such as a wide product recall or continued negative press attention (Blackwater or Halliburton, for example).

Colloquially, the term "negative brand equity" may be used to describe a product or service where a brand has a negligible effect on a product level when compared to a no-name or private label product.

=== Family branding vs. individual branding strategies ===
The greater a company's brand equity, the greater the probability that the company will use a family branding strategy rather than an individual branding strategy. This is because family branding allows them to leverage the equity accumulated in the core brand. Aspects of brand equity include: brand loyalty, awareness, association and perception of quality.

=== Automobile Industry ===
One of Oldsmobile's best known brands was "Cutlass". First used in 1961, by the 1980s it was confusingly used on three different platforms, with the Oldsmobile Cutlass Ciera becoming Oldsmobile's best selling model, which at different times would be sold alongside the smaller Cutlass Calais, and a newer Cutlass Supreme. The Aurora-inspired Intrigue introduced in 1988 retired the aging Cutlass nameplate with the intention to recast Oldsmobile into a future as in import fighter and its stodgy past as existing model names which had served in the past, including Cutlass, were phased out. But sales would continue to decline, as Cutlass briefly re-appeared as a rebadged Malibu in 1997. To reduce costs at General Motors by consolidating a profusion of divisions, the Oldsmobile division was entirely phased out in 2004.

Rival GM division Chevrolet re-entered the midsize market when the company resurrected the Malibu nameplate in 1997 (and later the Impala in 2000 as their answer to imports e.g. the Honda Accord and Toyota Camry including its stretched platform Avalon) which had been dormant since 1983 when the company phased out its remaining RWD midsize G platform. As of the 2018 model year, both nameplates are still in production. The Malibu, originally part of the mid-size Chevelle lineup until 1977 as the top trim level, GM promoted its trim level to full model status (at the time the Chevelle nameplate was retired (and has remained dormant since because of its association with the musclecar era) its trim level had brand recognition and better known), a practice first demonstrated in 1969 when the Chevy II lineup was rebadged (the Nova was the top trim level; it was one of the finalists for the official model name dating back to 1962 but Chevrolet management wanted its car nameplates beginning with a "C" – the promotion of the Nova from trim level to official model status broke the tradition of using C-word names by Chevrolet with its automobile and truck product lineup on a selective basis.

The Lincoln-Mercury division of the Ford Motor Company best known brand throughout the late 1960s to 2002 was the Mercury Cougar – first used as a twin to the Ford Mustang and later a personal luxury coupe sharing its platform with its midsize Torino lineup until 1977 when its entire midsize lineup (at the time branded as the Montego) was rebadged as part of the Cougar lineup which went viral (from a base coupe to a station wagon) until the early 1980s when L-M repositioned its midsized lineup by rebadging the Cougar under the Marquis nameplate.

In the early 2000s in North America, the Ford Motor Company made a strategic decision to brand all new or redesigned cars with names starting with "F." This aligned with the previous tradition of naming all sport utility vehicles since the Ford Explorer with the letter "E." The Toronto Star quoted an analyst who warned that changing the name of the well known Windstar to the Freestar would cause confusion and discard brand equity built up, while a marketing manager believed that a name change would highlight the new redesign. The aging Taurus, which became one of the most significant cars in American auto history, would be abandoned in favor of three entirely new names, all starting with "F," the Five Hundred, Freestar, and Fusion. By 2007, the Freestar was discontinued without a replacement. The Five Hundred name was thrown out and Taurus was brought back for the next generation of that car in a surprise move by Alan Mulally.

In practice, brand equity is difficult to measure. Because brands are crucial assets, however, both marketers and academic researchers have devised means to contemplate their value. Some of these techniques are described below.

== Methodologies ==
=== Brand Equity Ten (Aaker) ===
David Aaker, a marketing professor and brand consultant, highlights ten attributes of a brand that can be used to assess its strength. These include Differentiation, Satisfaction or Loyalty, Perceived Quality, Leadership or Popularity, Perceived Value, Brand Personality, Organizational Associations, Brand Awareness, Market Share, and Market Price and Distribution Coverage. Aaker doesn't weight the attributes or combine them in an overall score, as he believes any weighting would be arbitrary and would vary among brands and categories. Rather he recommends tracking each attribute separately.

=== Brand Equity Index (Moran) ===
Marketing executive Bill Moran has derived an index of brand equity as the product of three factors:

- Effective Market Share is a weighted average. It represents the sum of a brand's market shares in all segments in which it competes, weighted by each segment's proportion of that brand's total sales.
- Relative Price is a ratio. It represents the price of goods sold under a given brand, divided by the average price of comparable goods in the market.
- Durability is a measure of customer retention or loyalty. It represents the percentage of a brand's customers who will continue to buy goods under that brand in the following year.

=== BrandAsset Valuator (Young & Rubicam) ===
Young & Rubicam, a marketing communications agency, has developed the BrandAsset Valuator, BAV, a tool to diagnose the power and value of a brand. In using it, the agency surveys consumers' perspectives along four dimensions:

- Differentiation: The defining characteristics of the brand and its distinctiveness relative to competitors.
- Relevance: The appropriateness and connection of the brand to a given consumer.
- Esteem: Consumers' respect for and attraction to the brand.
- Knowledge: Consumers' awareness of the brand and understanding of what it represents.

=== Brand Contribution to Market Cap Method (CoreBrand) ===
CoreBrand – a research, brand strategy, communication, and design firm – utilizes the Brand Contribution to Market Cap method using the Corporate Branding Index® database composed of Familiarity and Favorability data as the quantitative basis of its system.

Familiarity and Favorability scores are analyzed in the context of a company's size in market cap and revenue to determine a base expected level of Familiarity and Favorability for the brand's value to be zero. Utilizing a statistical regression analysis of the factors driving the cash flow multiple and thus share price, the variance in Familiarity and Favorability above or below the base expected level is analyzed.
As a point in time analysis, this method is used for brand equity valuation of a company based on its current Familiarity and Favorability, Revenue and Market Cap. The output of the analysis provides the end user with two pieces of data:

1. The percentage of market cap that is attributable directly to its corporate brand (i.e., how hard the brand is working to create value for the company);
2. The dollar value of the brand at a point in time, this is the asset value of the brand as a component of the company's market valuation.

According to this analysis, the corporate brand is responsible for 5-7% of stock performance on average.

=== Conjoint Analysis ===
Marketers use conjoint analysis to measure consumers' preference for various attributes of a product, service, or provider, such as features, design, price, or location. By including brand and price as two of the attributes under consideration, they can gain insight into consumers' valuation of a brand—that is, their willingness to pay a premium for it.

Note: These customer satisfaction methodologies have not been independently validated by the Marketing Accountability Standards Board (MASB) according to MMAP (Marketing Metric Audit Protocol).

=== Brand Equity with Time-Series Data (Event Study) ===
While event study offer evidence that brand equity positively affects financial performance, many studies focus on customer mindset metrics to offer this relationship (Berger, Eechambadi, George, Lehmann, Rizley & Venkatesan, 2006; Buil, Martinez & de Chernatony, 2013).

Event method is applied to determine the stakeholder interest or value assessed in a brand before, during or after an event. As exemplified by Agrawal & Kamakura's (1995) research, the economic worth of celebrity endorsers, the authors demonstrate that an announcement of brand association of a product and celebrity creates a movement in stock value; whereby, shareholder interest is influenced by the endorsement as evidenced from the time-series data.

A similar time-series data analysis offered by Lane & Jacobson (1995) also measured stock market reactions to announcements associated with a particular brand, which factored customer attitudes and the familiarity of the brand to determine financial outcomes. The result was that the stock market response was favorable to brand announcements when consumers were familiar with the brand and held the brand in high esteem. The same applied to low familiarity and low esteem brands, which as Keller (2002) explains, was "because there was little to risk and much to gain …"(p. 157).

Other researchers examine the antecedents of brand equity or brand value. For instance, Roy & Cornwell (2003) showed that lesser known brands may benefit from event sponsorships as a brand-building exercise but customers may have associations with the event sponsors or brand associations that could determine affective attitudes. Ultimately, high equity counterparts will yield stronger results due to their market familiarity.

Simon & Sullivan (1993) suggested long-term analysis of events, as determined by financial returns and market performance, better captures the effect of customer mindset brand equity. In the restaurant sector, for example, returns of branding are contemporaneous. The high-tech sector showed no contemporaneous effects and brand equity is realized in the future with significant delay. The distribution/retail sector included both contemporaneous and positive future profitability. Berger et al., (2006) acknowledge the long-term approach for considering customer lifetime value relevant to the shareholder value or financial performance of a brand. This perspective contributed to concepts like "brand awareness", which Huang & Sarigöllü (2012) apply to the commonly used marketing metrics to determine stock market performance.

== Managing brand equity ==
One of the challenges in managing brands is the many changes that occur in the marketing environment. The marketing environment evolves and changes, often in very significant ways. Shifts in consumer behavior, competitive strategies, government regulations, and other aspects of the marketing environment can profoundly affect the fortunes of a brand. Besides these external forces, the firm itself may engage in a variety of activities and changes in strategic focus or direction that may necessitate adjustments in the way that its brands are being marketed. Consequently, effective brand management requires proactive strategies designed to at least maintain – if not actually enhance – brand equity in the face of these different forces.

=== Brand reinforcement ===
As a company's major enduring asset, a brand needs to be carefully managed so its value does not depreciate. Marketers can reinforce brand equity by consistently conveying the brand's meaning in terms of

(1) what product it represents, what core benefits it supplies, and what needs it satisfies

(2) how the brand makes the product superior and which strong, favorable, and unique brand associations should exist in consumers' minds.

Both of these issues – brand meaning in terms of products, benefits, and needs as well as brand meaning in terms of product differentiation – depend on the firm's general approach to product development, branding strategies, and other strategic concerns.

=== Brand re-genesis ===
Changes in the marketing environment can affect a brand's performance. Brand revitalization typically begins with an assessment of the existing sources of brand equity, including whether positive associations have weakened or lost distinctiveness, or whether negative associations have developed. This analysis informs the decision of whether to retain the existing brand positioning or adopt a new one.

=== Maintaining brand consistency ===
Without question, the most important consideration in reinforcing brands is the consistency of the marketing support that the brand receives – both in terms of the amount and nature of marketing support. Brand consistency is critical to maintaining the strength and favorability of brand associations. Brands that receive inadequate support, in terms of such things as shrinking research and development or marketing communication budgets, run the risk of becoming technologically disadvantaged or even obsolete. Consistency does not mean, however, that marketers should avoid making any changes in the marketing program. On the contrary, the opposite can be quite true – being consistent in managing brand equity may require numerous tactical shifts and changes in order to maintain the proper strategic thrust and direction of the brand. There are many ways that brand awareness and brand image can be created, maintained, or improved through carefully designed marketing programs. The tactics that may be most effective for a particular brand at any one time can certainly vary from those that may be most effective for the brand at another time. As a consequence, prices may move up or down, product features may be added or dropped, ad campaigns may employ different creative strategies and slogans, and different brand extensions may be introduced or withdrawn over time in order to create the same desired knowledge structures in consumers' minds.

== See also ==
- Brand
- Brand Architecture
- Brand extension
- Brand language
- Brand management
- Brand valuation
- Customer engagement
- Equity (disambiguation)
- Marketing
- Product management
- Semantic Brand Score
- Threaded marketing
- Visual brand language
