= Emotional branding =

Type of product branding

Emotional branding is a term used within marketing communication that refers to the practice of building brands that appeal directly to a consumer's emotional state, needs and aspirations. Emotional branding is successful when it triggers an emotional response in the consumer, that is, a desire for the advertised brand (or product) that cannot fully be rationalized. Emotional brands have a significant impact when the consumer experiences a strong and lasting attachment to the brand comparable to a feeling of bonding, companionship or love. Examples of emotional branding include the nostalgic attachment to the Kodak brand of film, bonding with the Jim Beam bourbon brand, and love for the McDonald's brand.

== History ==
The practice of branding originated during the ancient times when it was used by craftsmen to imprint trademarks on their goods. Branding does not only help identify, but it also ensures the quality of goods and services the buyer and trader will purchase from the manufacturer. In history, cattle and sheep were branded with hot irons to indicate ownership. Humans were also marked to classify their social status. Slaves were marked to indicate ownership and criminals are labelled distinctly to show disgrace. Similarly, victims of the World War II Nazi persecution were branded with numbers as they entered the concentration camps. However, despite the history filled with negative connotation linked with branding, it has been replaced with a positive and more commercialized meaning, which relates to the use of categorising brand goods and services.

The Industrial Revolution caused a massive shift in the future of branding as it transformed the importance and value of visual identification and trademarks. During this period, when railways and roadwork promoted a larger scope of product distribution in different areas, branding emerged as a way to differentiate various local and exported goods by simply using logos. This early form of branding created familiarity with different goods and it began to build trust among its loyal consumers. Companies were also focused on prioritizing the quality of product being distributed to ensure the return of loyal buyers and eventually, it will initiate growth of demand in the market.

Apart from ensuring the quality of the goods, tradesmen were able to invent different forms of advertisements to reach their target market. New target markets were formed since the revolution did not just trigger a shift in the marketing industry, but it also instigated a powerful impact on social classes. Tradesmen began to promote their products to the rising middle class because of their buying power as a mass market. Sellers were aware that not many people were able to read newspapers as this new social class enters the market, hence they expanded their creative thinking and began experimenting new ways to reach out to potential customers. For example, via men wearing placards, banners streaming from handheld poles and umbrella signs.

The rapid expansion of consumer goods post-World War II only increased existing goods in the market through amassed innovation, creating another major shift in branding, which is more focused on superior features, unique ingredients and functional benefits. Businesses began to think innovatively to create brand identity using their products in an attempt to associate lifestyle with brands. Pears soap brand became a highly demanded product because Thomas J. Barratt - known to be the "Father of Modern Advertising" – always looked for new ways to endorse the product. Barratt used different techniques of creative advertising that would help the soap product appeal to the mass. Barratt used a series of themed posters using imagery and catchphrases to associate the brand with quality and luxury. The series has a reoccurring theme and one of the posters used an iconic painting by John Everett Millais entitled "Bubbles". The painting was inspired by Millais' grandson and it was illustrated out of his delight for the child. The painting portrays pure innocence as Millais took the opportunity to paint his grandson because of how exquisite he looked while holding the pipe to make bubbles. Barratt then used the painting's meaning to be part of the Pears Soap message. The soap was added on the foreground pertaining that well-groomed middle-class children could enjoy domestic comforts and have aspirations of high society.

Companies began to adapt Barratt's technique to help achieve success on their own products, marking the beginning of modern emotional branding through the manipulation of human emotion to sell goods. Many businesses began to catch on to the trend of brand identity to distinguish their products from others in a growing market. In 2001, Marc Gobé wrote Emotional Branding: The New Paradigm for Connecting Brands to People to delve into the idea of "emotional branding". Gobé created the concept as part of his observation that there is a possible connection in an emotional level in a consumer-brand relationship. Gobé wrote, "Brands must recognize that their emotional identity is not only a result of ads and products, but also corporate policy and stances. The message can be sent in subtle ways that a company is supportive of the gay community. The key components are inclusivity, sophistication, and subtlety." He explains that emotional branding is distinct from the literal sense of brand awareness because of its ability to connect with its users on an emotional level from advertising to the physical product where it is able to make the user feel certain emotions the company aims to convey. It also reflects the company's internal culture as the business must have a harmony and unified goal to be able to successfully reach their target market.

== Emotions towards a brand ==
An emotional bond must be developed between the consumer and the product for a brand to be successful. Emotion is a mental state derived from ones intuitive feelings, which arise from reasoning, knowledge and cognitive appraisals of events or thoughts. Emotion may trigger actions depending on its nature and the reason for the person having emotion. Emotions happen as feedback of what one makes of a situation such as a brand consumption experience. Emotion is different from attitude, attitude is learned over time and controls responses whereas emotion is rarely consistent and occurs differently in separate events. Therefore, emotion is less consistent than attitude. Emotions arise on brand consumption and attitudes do not. Attitude is harder to change than emotion. Emotion plays a dominant role on the influence of brand experience and brand loyalty, "marketing practitioners need to pay more attention to customers emotions than to customers brand cognition" (Ding & Tseng, 2015). Emotions cause the positive or negative relationship between brand experience and brand loyalty. Consumers are likely to indulge in emotionally or culturally significant products. This is where experiential marketing is proven effective as it can attain brand loyalty by appealing to emotions. Emotions are triggered by fantasies, imagination, feelings, and pleasure experienced during consumption of an object. The promise of pleasure in consumption forms a powerful and ongoing motivation for consumers to want to experience the pleasurable feelings again and again. Consumers tend to be loyal to a brand because they want to re-experience the pleasurable feelings.

== Customer emotional attachment ==
Emotional branding is critical in marketing as customer emotional attachment towards a brand such as feelings of sympathy, sadness, pride, and anger results in distinct meaning of the individual's environment and therefore has unique motivational implications towards the choice and decision making. Marketers use tactics such as a young child or an animal to capture the hearts of the audience. This bond between the customer and the brand affects the behaviour of the customer, which in turn can foster the firm's profitability and the customer's value to the firm. It is a basic human need to want to form an attachment. Customers can form emotional attachments to an array of objects such as collectibles, gifts and of course brands. Despite the fact that an emotional attachment to an object is unlikely to be similar in strength as an attachment between two humans, the fundamental properties and behavioural effects of emotional attachment are similar. Emotional attachment to a brand is underpinned by love, affection and connection towards the brand. These components of emotional attachment convey that a customer with a stronger emotional attachment is likely to be more committed and emotionally attached to a brand. Emotional attachment at a higher level is likely to increase a customer's emotional need for the brand. As the customer becomes more united with a brand, they are likely to stay relatively close with the brand as the presence of the brand offers feelings of enjoyment, delight, and security. This concludes that a customer with higher levels of attachment to a brand is more likely to commit to being in a long-term relationship with the brand. Marketers need to ensure they are reaching the right kind of emotions within the consumer, which correlate with the brand.

== Purpose ==
The purpose of emotional branding is to create a bond between the consumer and the product by provoking the consumer's emotion. Vance Packard's The Hidden Persuaders speaks to the emotional response of consumers to advertising. It reads,"In the buying situation, the consumer generally acts emotionally and compulsively, unsubconsciously reacting to the images and designs that are associated with the product." The notion that emotion is not only associated with compulsiveness and irrationality, but is a subconscious reaction, is the framework that drives emotional branding theory.

Today's most successful companies are said to have built relationships with consumers by engaging them in a personal dialogue that responds to their needs. Marketers who've broken through the clutter have done so by connecting with consumers and, thereby, have created strong emotional bonds through their brands. Author Barbara Green states "You have to have a love affair with the consumer-flirt with them, provide that titillating buzz. When that flirtatious relationship becomes a deep relationship, then you have a major brand."

The process of Emotional Branding has an underlying concept based on four important factors which acts as a blueprint: Relationship, Sensorial Experience, Imagination and Vision.

The relationship aspect of emotional branding establish a connection based on mutual respect for consumers by giving them an experience that touches them emotionally. It is critical that the companies are able to adapt with the rapid shifting of consumer trends. Many organizations are not aware of the changing trends in the consumer population, such as the growing number of multicultural races in the target market and the impact of feminism in our current generation, which is profoundly affecting consumer brand expectations.

Researchers are yet to expound the depths of sensorial experience because it could potentially lead to deeper explanation as to how and why the use multi-sensory brand experience could trigger an emotional response from the consumer. Sensorial experience also explains how companies were able to apply and manipulate human emotions on the product to win the favour of consumers.

Imagination is the piece of emotional branding that enables the entire process. Innovative approaches include an in-depth study of the design detail of a product from production, packaging, delivery in stores and advertisement. At this stage, these media must have developed a new way of appealing to the hearts of consumers. This challenges future institutions to continuously generate innovative ideas to keep the business growing in the market, as well as keeping the interest of present consumers.

Envisioning the brand's future essential for achieving long-term success. As new competitors enter the market, businesses must continuously innovate to maintain their market position and remain competitive. This involves developing fresh ideas, addressing emerging market gaps, and creating products or services that meet changing customer needs. By adapting to market trends and consistently delivering value, businesses can strengthen customer loyalty and sustain their competitive advantage. Ultimately, a forward-thinking approach not only supports long-term growth but also demonstrates the importance of building a brand that can evolve with future market demands.

Gobé created the "Ten Commandments of Emotional Branding" to further explain the key differences between brand awareness in comparison with a brand's ability to connect emotionally with its consumers, allowing the brand to express its desire to be preferred. The works of Marc Gobé, including his groundbreaking book Emotional Branding, have been translated into numerous languages. The Persian edition is published by Bazaryabi Publishing in Iran and is available for purchase through their website, marketingshop.ir

The Ten Commandments of Emotional Branding:

i. From Consumers → to People

Emotional branding allows companies to create a relationship with its consumers that is based on mutual respect. This approach would help potential consumers to have a positive attitude towards the product, creating an attraction between the brand and the items being sold without being forced to purchase.

ii. From Product → to Experience

Emotional branding creates an emotional memory between the buyer and the product as a form of connection that goes beyond need. Need is based on price and convenience, buying the product experience has an added value to it which money won't be able to buy.

iii. From Honesty → to Trust

Emotional branding builds trust. It is one of the fundamental values of a brand which requires genuine effort from the company. This brings total comfort to customers and it gives advantage to the company because the buyers will put their brand as one of their top choices.

iv. From Quality → to Preference

Emotional Branding helps a brand become a consumer's preference. The quality is an essential factor to stay in business, however achieving preferential status by consumers mean that the product made a real connection with its users.

v. From Notoriety → to Aspiration

Emotional Branding shapes a business to be an aspiration instead of simply being known. Brand awareness creates familiarity with its users but to be attain success, the brand must be able to inspire the user to be desired.

vi. From Identity → to Personality

Emotional Branding teaches a company to build its personality to create a lasting impact on users. Brand personalities form charismatic attitude that would trigger positive emotional response towards the brand.

vii. From Function → to Feel

Emotional Branding makes experience as an important factor in creating brand identity. The product may perform according to its practical function, but emotional branding enables the user to have a deeper emotional experience while using the product.

viii. From Ubiquity → to Presence

Similar with having an experience, emotional branding promotes brand presence as it also creates an impact on potential users, ensuring a permanent connection with people.

ix. From Communication → to Dialogue

Emotional branding encourages to have a conversation with its target audience. It means that there should be a dialogue from the company relayed to the target audience via personal message to share actual experiences with the product.

x. From Service → to Relationship

Emotional branding helps create a special relationship between the brand and its loyal users. Creating a relationship with the consumers is perhaps the most important aspect of emotional branding because the company intends to have a deep connection with its customers and it will create an important bond among its users.

Following this guideline will allow growing businesses to establish and develop deep relationship with their target market. This allows new associations to build strong foundations for their company culture, portraying personalities and specific values which reflect the entity as a whole. This way, consumers would create a closer bond with the brand as the product managed to trigger an emotional response the company was hoping to achieve from its users.

Though it would be safe to think that the criteria consumers use to make their buying decisions were based on price and quality consideration, it is more likely that users will make choices based primarily on emotional instinct. Consumers will use their emotions as the foundation of their judgement and as the old saying goes "feelings are facts". It is important to foster positive emotional connections not only when communicating with potential customers, but also it should extend to long-time audience to keep their loyalty. Emotional branding gives less focus on the quality, convenience and value of the goods but to be able to maintain a strong bond in a long term basis, it emphasizes the importance of building strong bond with their customers.

== Techniques ==
Emotional branding uses the consumer's ability to process messages to promote a significant feeling associated with the brand.

The two types of processing that a person can use to comprehend branding are Active Processing, which is learning that happens when deep, attentive processing is being applied, or, Implicit processing, which is when meaning can be processed without awareness. Emotional branding is quite complex, in that a person can interpret a brand image through attentive processing, but once their emotions are provoked, the meaning that they take from the brand image can be implicitly processed, or in other words, subconsciously created. Author Antonio Damasio notes, "We are more vulnerable when we are only vaguely aware that our emotions are being influenced, and most vulnerable when we have no idea at all that our emotions are being influenced." An example of this could be music playing in a store to create a subconscious mood.

There are multiple techniques for achieving an emotional response to a brand. The first, and perhaps the most complicated method is by attaching the brand to a certain set of ideological values. This works best when the advertiser has done substantial amounts of research on the demographic audience, knowing what values and ideas will trigger an emotional response and connection to the brand. The values can be embedded into the brand through images and language. An example of this would be the family values and essence of childhood and bonding portrayed in Walt Disney World Ads.

Emotional branding uses a series of themes and symbols to create meaning for a consumer. In this sense, "theme" means a concept or story line that is present throughout an ad, and if integrated well-enough, throughout the brand. A "symbol" is representative of the theme. Vance Packard's The Hidden Persuaders suggests that the symbol represents a promise and consumers buy the promise. The text reads, "The cosmetic manufacturers are not selling Lanolin, they are selling hope. We no longer buy oranges, we buy vitality. We do not buy just an auto, we buy prestige." As suggested in Edward Bernays' The Engineering of Consent, Themes must appeal to human motivations in order to be successful. Motivation lies deep with a person's subconscious desires to achieve or meet certain goals. Bernays suggests that there is an extensive list of factors that drive motivation based on both ideological values and personal experience. There are a few techniques used with symbolism. The first is making the theme and symbol of a brand continuously publicized. The second technique is making sure that the theme and symbol hold substance and promote a specific idea about the company. The company symbol needs to be adaptable to a changing society while standing firmly as a set of values. Symbols can represent multiple themes simultaneously, as suggested by Bernays. For example, a kitten can represent both playfulness and comfort. Symbols provide a promise for a sense of fulfillment associated with their brand. Vance Packard highlights the eight hidden needs that consumers have that themes and symbols attempt to sell. The eight needs are as follows:

1. Emotional security
2. Reassurance of worth
3. Ego-gratification
4. Creative outlets
5. Love objects
6. Sense of power
7. Sense of roots
8. Immortality

These needs, which are subconsciously emotion-based, serve as a foundation for emotional branding and allow marketers to create a self-fulfilling prophecy when it comes to consumer needs. People want to fulfill these needs, and advertisers promote the need to fulfill these needs in a perpetual cycle.

A second method of emotional branding is making a literal statement about a product and its association to emotion. An example of this can be seen in a 1966 Hamlet Cigar ad that states "Happiness is a cigar called Hamlet." This associates the brand with a particular emotion in the most literal way possible.

A third method of association to emotion is giving the consumer an emotional reaction to an ad. An example of this in advertising could be calming music playing simultaneously with images of people enjoying the product. This method works best when irrational emotions are evoked. For example, playing somber music with images of people struggling without the product would create an irrational connection to the product by playing on the consumer's sadness. In one way, the brand creates a positive connotation with itself, in another, the brand creates a negative connotation of life without the product. These are both examples of emotional branding.

Emotional branding is something that comes with time and long standing presence. For example, attachment of the specific emotion of "nostalgia" to the Kodak brand of film, "bonding" to the Jim Beam bourbon brand, and "love" to the McDonald's brand are built over time. Through repetition of these themes and symbols, these brand names have reached brand euphoria, where meaning no longer needs to be created, as enough branding has been done to solidify the brand image.

Emotional branding is a notable tool used in advertising in many South and Southeast Asian countries particularly Thailand, India, Singapore and Malaysia. They normally run between 3 minutes to over 15 minutes in length and generally depict a story.

== Criticism ==
One of the more obvious criticisms of emotional branding is concerning the morality of manipulating human emotion, which can be often an extremely vulnerable and irrational element of human thinking. Ethicist Richard Lippke notes that certain messages portrayed through branding should be criticized. These messages are:

1. Encouragement to accept emotional appeals, oversimplification, superficiality and shoddy standards of proof for claims.
2. An emphasis on ease and gratification rather than on austerity and restraint.
3. The notion that advertisers should allow people to show them how to live the good life.
4. A constant encouragement to consume lest one miss out on something new.
5. The false belief that products will deliver the non-market good with which they are associated.

A similar criticism of emotional branding concerns its very origin as the use of propaganda. Many criticisms have been formed concerning advertising's relation to propaganda, as the very first ideas about public relations and many ideas about advertising and branding came from the same man, Edward Bernays, who perfected the art of propaganda.

A third criticism of emotional branding is in reference to the growing homogeneity of products on the market and the desperate attempt of marketers to differentiate their brand. From The Hidden Persuaders: "The greater the similarity between products, the less part reason really plays in brand selection." Because of the amount of competition today, the industry calls for more ways to subliminally influence consumers. The idea of influencing a consumer based on psychological research is controversial in itself and has been subject to extreme criticism throughout the development of the advertising industry. Due to both the similarity of products and the overwhelming volume of advertisements, marketers are employing more creative and sometimes contentious tactics to influence consumer perception at a subliminal level.
