= Visual brand language =

Type of design system

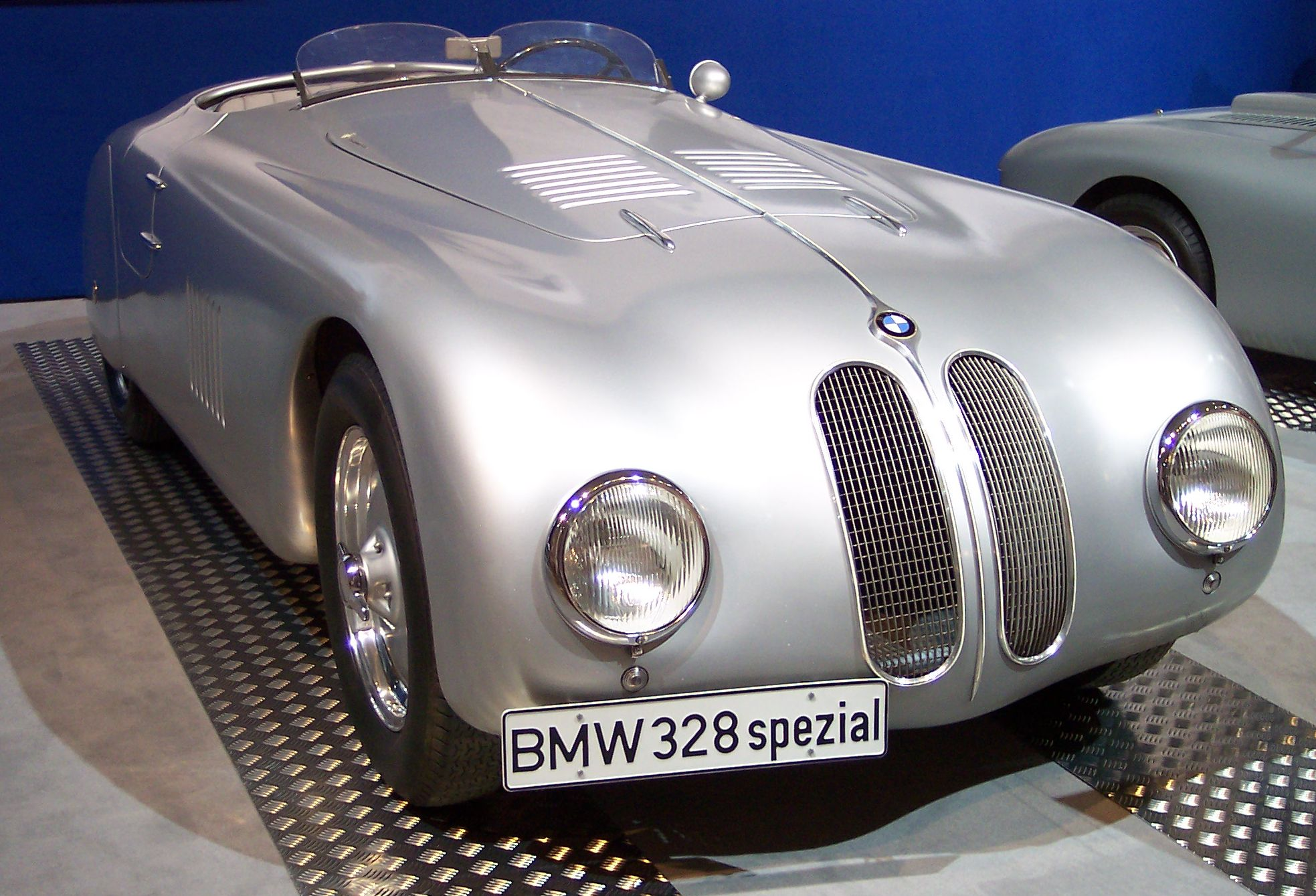
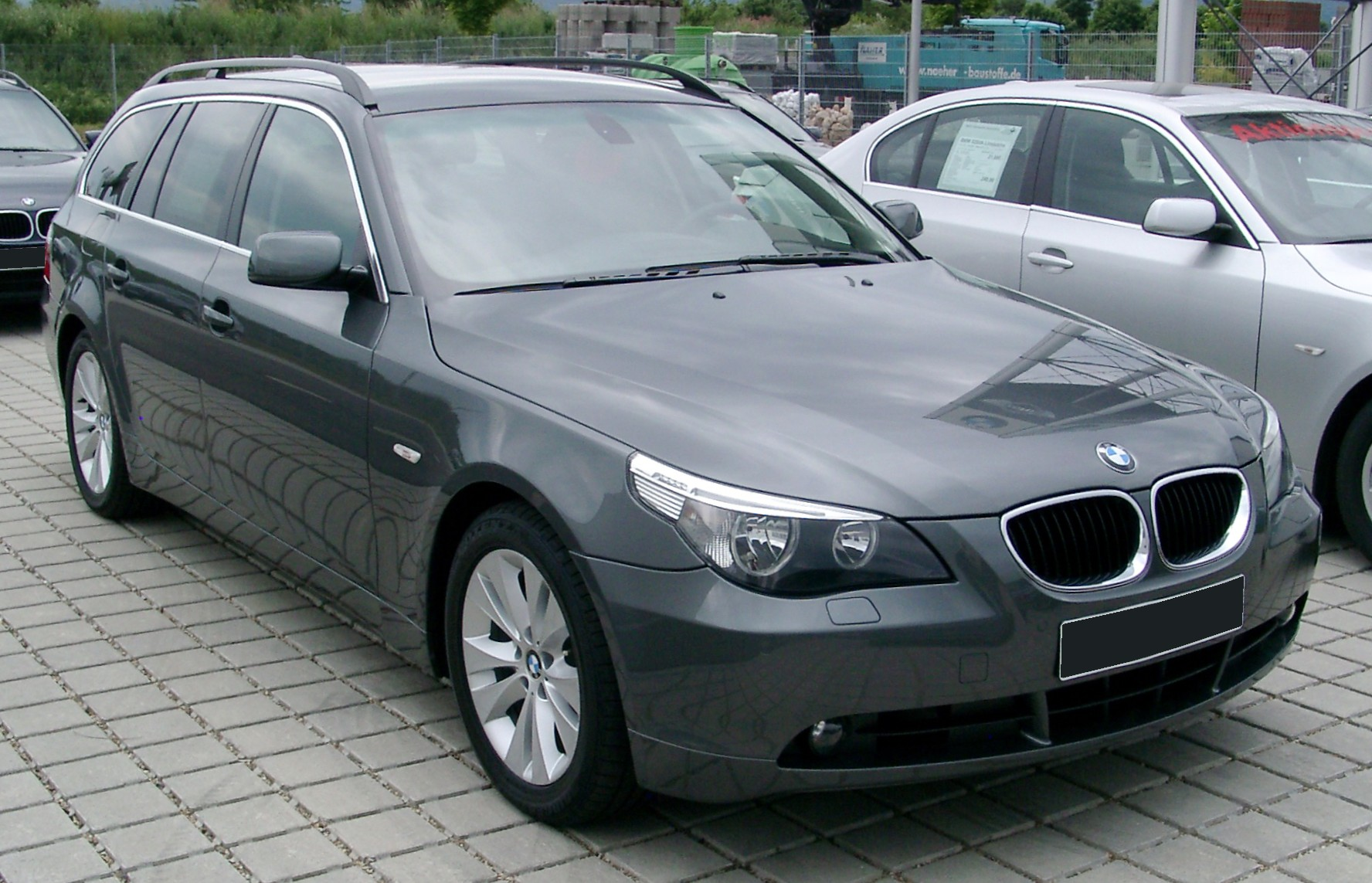
BMW's "split grille" design in 1938 (left) and 2008 (right)

Visual brand language is the intentional use of design elements—such as shape, color, materials, finish, typography and composition—to subliminally communicate a company's values and personality through imagery and design style. It is intended to create a first impression of the brand for the consumer. It is considered by some to be an essential part of gaining both a substantial customer base and work force. Effective visual brand language aims to create a consistent experience for consumers.

For example, the primary pieces of the Starbucks were black and white icons. These icons are certain collection Starbucks will use throughout its brand. Each year, their promotional campaigns would use the same set of icons, but different ones displayed each time, and in different color palettes.

Another distinguishing iconic design element is the BMW 'split grille' continuously employed to represent the brand. While the grille size and design details evolve over time, the underlying idea is consistent, allowing it to stay familiar to its audience.

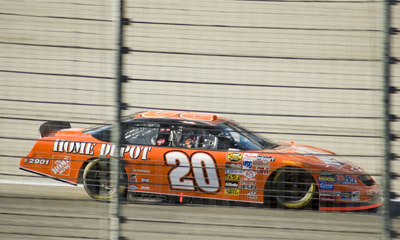
Home Depot's use of orange for marketing

Color can be used similarly as consistent imagery, as demonstrated by The Home Depot's application of orange across all of its brand materials.

== The strategic pyramid ==
The strategic pyramid is a four-staged hierarchical pyramid that serves as a guideline to establish the visual brand language of a business. It demonstrates the parts of a design that allow a brand to develop a distinctive identity and reach its target market.

This pyramid serves as a reference system for designers and other individuals within the company to better understand and create the brand personality, product attributes, design principles, and signature elements of the brand design. Starbucks Coffee will be used as an example to help better illustrate this pyramid.

=== Brand personality ===
Brand personality is understood as the human characteristics or traits that can be attributed to a brand. This is also known as brand identity. In 21st century business, it is important for a business to distinguish itself from its competitors through Emotional branding. By establishing a brand personality, businesses can form emotional bonds with their consumers which in turn establishes future behaviours of Brand loyalty. Brands have the ability "to fill a void, to take root, and to flourish." For example, from the very beginning, the brand mantra of Starbucks Coffee was to create a "rich, rewarding coffee experience," extending its brand identity beyond the functional attributes of its products.

By establishing desired traits of a brand, businesses can then take the next step of building strategies to successfully communicate their brand personality to consumers.

=== Product attributes ===
Product attributes are meant to highlight and describe the uniqueness of a brand. This can be achieved through a variety of ways, however it must build upon an established brand personality as previously mentioned. Product attributes are the traits that distinguish a brand against its competitors. Starbucks' brand personality has been associated by customers with values of "comfort, quality, and community." Starbucks coffee has achieved the attributes of their brand by understanding that their coffee was not the only key driver to their success. They focused on creating a comfortable atmosphere within the store known as the "Starbucks Experience," where both employee and customer come in for more than just coffee. Product attributes are meant to "deliver new ideas to existing products and services."

=== Design principles ===
Design principles are specific directions and objectives that designers can refer to when designing a product or platform. In order to accomplish this, designers build on established product attributes with specific visual concepts that help guide brand expressions. This is the process of taking the product attributes and transforming them into a tangible and actionable item. For example, before designers work on designing a store for Starbucks, they are required to start their careers by working behind the counter. By understanding how the store layout works with both baristas and customers, designers can better create a workspace that is both aesthetic and functional. Howard Shultz, the CEO of Starbucks, is fond of saying that "retail is detail" and that if anything that goes overlooked customers become unhappy and costly errors occur.

=== Signature elements ===
Signature elements are a series of toolkits used in creating and translating visual brand language. This includes color, material and finish, logo, light, and sound. Research shows that elements of logo such as its shape, color, size, and design can profoundly affect how consumers interpret the brand. Even the angularity of a logo- whether the logo is visually angular or circular—can affect consumers interpretation and loyalty toward a brand. The way that color communicates to audiences is known as color psychology or Color symbolism. Businesses utilise how color communicates in order to both further establish brand personality and connect with the customer. For example, Starbucks uses the colors green and white in their logo. Green is a color that is secure, natural, easygoing and relaxing. White is a color that symbolizes goodness, purity, and sophistication. The Starbucks logo itself has stood the test of time by evolving with the company in direct relationship to their corporate identity. The center piece of their logo, the Siren, helps tie Starbucks to its traditional coffee roots in both Europe and Seattle. Another way Starbucks translates their visual brand language is through their stores atmosphere that is not only utilized by store design, but through music. Timothy Jones was the first to recognize that music could be used not only to highlight the Starbucks experience but to also further the brand image of Starbucks by supporting artists through Starbucks record label Hear Music.

== See also ==
- Brand language
- Graphic design
- Marketing
- Brand management
