= Brand architecture =

How brands within a company's portfolio relate to each other

In the marketing field of brand management, brand architecture is the structure of brands within an organizational entity. It is the way brands within a company's portfolio are related to, and differentiated from, one another. According to J.-N. Kapferer, the brand architecture should define the different leagues of branding within the organization; how the corporate brand and sub-brands relate to and support each other; and how the sub-brands reflect or reinforce the core purpose, or business strategy, of the corporate brand they belong to. Often, decisions about brand architecture are concerned with how to manage a parent brand and a family of sub-brands – managing brand architecture to maximize shareholder value can include using brand-valuation model techniques.

One may regard the designing of a brand architecture as an integrated process of brand building through establishing brand relationships among branding options in the competitive environment. The brand architecture of an organization at any time is, in large measure, a legacy of past management decisions as well as of the competitive realities brands face in the marketplace.

Beyond its traditional focus on relationships among corporate, product, and sub-brands, strategic brand architecture has also been used to describe the coordinated design of meaning, evidence, symbolic expression, experience, and decision pathways through which supportable organizational value becomes recognizable in the market.

== Types ==
There are three key levels of branding:

- Corporate brand, umbrella brand, and family brand – Examples include Heinz and Virgin Group. These are consumer-facing brands used across all the firm's activities, and this name is how they are known to all their stakeholders – consumers, employees, shareholders, partners, suppliers and other parties. These brands may also be used in conjunction with product descriptions or sub-brands: for example Heinz Tomato Ketchup or Virgin Atlantic.
- Endorsed brands, and sub-brands – For example, Nestle KitKat, Cadbury Dairy Milk, Sony PlayStation or Polo by Ralph Lauren. These brands include a parent brand—which may be a corporate brand, an umbrella brand, or a family brand – as an endorsement to a sub-brand or an individual, product brand. The endorsement should add credibility to the endorsed sub-brand in the eyes of consumers.
- Individual product brand – For example, Procter & Gamble’s Pampers or Unilever's Dove. The individual brands are presented to consumers, and the parent company name is given little or no prominence. Other stakeholders, like shareholders or partners, know the producer by its company name.

Procter & Gamble is quoted by many authors as the antithesis of a corporate brand (Asberg and Uggla, Muzellec and Lambkin, Olins). "However, this situation changed in 2012. After more than 150 years of invisibility of the organization for consumer, the brand developed corporate brand promise during the 2012 Olympic games. Commercials are aired on television around a message thanking all the "moms". In addition, each of their products is associated with the brand "PG" in advertisements for products.

A recent example of brand architecture in action is the reorganization of the General Motors brand portfolio to reflect its new strategy. Prior to bankruptcy, the company pursued a corporate-endorsed hybrid brand architecture structure, where GM underpinned every brand. The practice of putting the "GM Mark of Excellence" on every car, no matter what the brand, was discontinued in August 2009. In the run-up to the IPO, the company adopted a multiple brand corporate invisible brand architecture structure. The company's familiar square blue "badge" has been removed from the Web site and advertising, in favor of a new, subtle all-text logo treatment.

== Branded house and House of brands ==
In academic literature typically two terms are referred to, when brand architecture or brand clusters are explained. The terms Branded House and House of Brands were popularized by Dr. David Aaker.

=== Branded House ===
Is specialised by having a strong master brand with sub brands also carrying the master brand. FedEx is an example of a master brand with FedEx Freight as a sub brand. This tactic is normally used, when companies intend to use the master brands brand equity to held the sub brand.

=== House of Brands ===
With this tactic there is no visible link between the master brand and the sub brands. Procter and Gamble is a popular example where Procter & Gamble is the master brand with hundreds of sub brands like Oral-B and Pampers below.

== See also ==
- Aspirational brand
- Brand aversion
- Brand community
- Brand engagement
- Brand implementation
- Brand loyalty
- Brand orientation
