= Brand loyalty =

Marketing term for a consumer's emotional attachment to a given brand

In marketing and consumer behaviour, brand loyalty refers to a consumer's consistent preference for a particular brand and their commitment to repeatedly purchasing its products or services despite competing alternatives, market changes, or product shortcomings. It may also be reflected in behaviors such as positive word-of-mouth advocacy.

Corporate brand loyalty describes a pattern in which consumers repeatedly purchase products from the same manufacturer rather than switching to competitors. In business-to-business contexts, a similar concept is sometimes referred to as source loyalty.

Brand loyalty implies an attitudinal commitment and should be distinguished from habitual purchasing, which may occur without emotional attachment or deliberate preference.

Organizations whose financial performance and ethical positioning rely significantly on maintaining strong customer loyalty are sometimes described as operating under a loyalty-driven business model.

== Marketing ==
Brand loyalty, in marketing, consists of a consumer's commitment to repurchase or continue to use the brand. Consumers can demonstrate brand loyalty by repeatedly buying a product, service, or by other positive behaviors such as by engaging in word of mouth advocacy. This concept of a brand displays imagery and symbolism for a product or range of products. Brands can engage consumers and make them feel emotionally attached. Consumers' beliefs and attitudes make up brand images, and these affect how they will view brands with which they come into contact. Brand experience occurs when consumers shop or search for, and consume products. Holistic experiences such as sense, relation, acting, and feeling occur when one comes into contact with brands. The stronger and more relational these senses are to the individual, the more likely it is that individual will make repeat purchases. After contact has been made, psychological reasoning will occur, followed by a decision to buy or not to buy. This can result in repeat purchase behavior, thus incurring the beginning brand loyalty. Brand loyalty is not limited to repeat purchase behavior, as there is deeper psychological reasoning as to why an individual will continuously re-purchase products from one brand. Brand loyalty can be defined as the "behavioral willingness" to consistently maintain relations with a particular brand. In a survey of nearly 200 senior marketing managers, 68 percent responded that they found the "loyalty" metric very useful.

Brand loyalty occurs when consumers are willing to pay higher prices for a certain brand and go out of their way for the brand, or think highly of it.

Brand loyalty can predict brand performance outcomes. It also highlights the importance of marketing communication when trying to promote a certain product that's not doing as well as other brands. Marketers are able to look at the patterns of brand loyalty and pick out characteristics that make that product thrive.

Examples of brand loyalty promotions include My Coke Rewards, Pepsi Stuff, and Marriott Rewards.

=== Long-term impact on business ===
Brand loyalty in marketing consists of a consumer's devotion, bond, and commitment to repurchase and continue to use a brand's product or service over time, regardless of changes with competitors' pricing or changes in the external environment. Brand loyalty reflects a customer's commitment to remain in a relationship for a long period of time with a brand.

A critical factor of building brand loyalty is developing a connection or relationship between the consumer and the brand. When an emotional relationship is created between the consumer and the brand, this leads to a strong bond and a competitive advantage for that particular brand. Loyalty consists of both attitudinal and behavioral components. Attitudinal loyalty relates to the customer's willingness to purchase a product or service from the brand at any reasonable cost. Behavioral loyalty is re-purchasing. Both behavioral and attitudinal components are important. One example is that a consumer displays behavioral loyalty by buying Coke when there are few alternatives available and attitudinal loyalty when they will not buy an alternative brand when Coke is not available. The attitudinal component is psychological, this leads to the behavioral action of repeat purchase. It is the attitudinal loyalty that drives most loyalty behavior and ensures loyalty over time, not just with one purchase. “Brand loyalty is desired by firms because retention of existing customers is less costly than obtaining new ones. Firms profit from having loyal customers”.

=== Benefits for companies ===
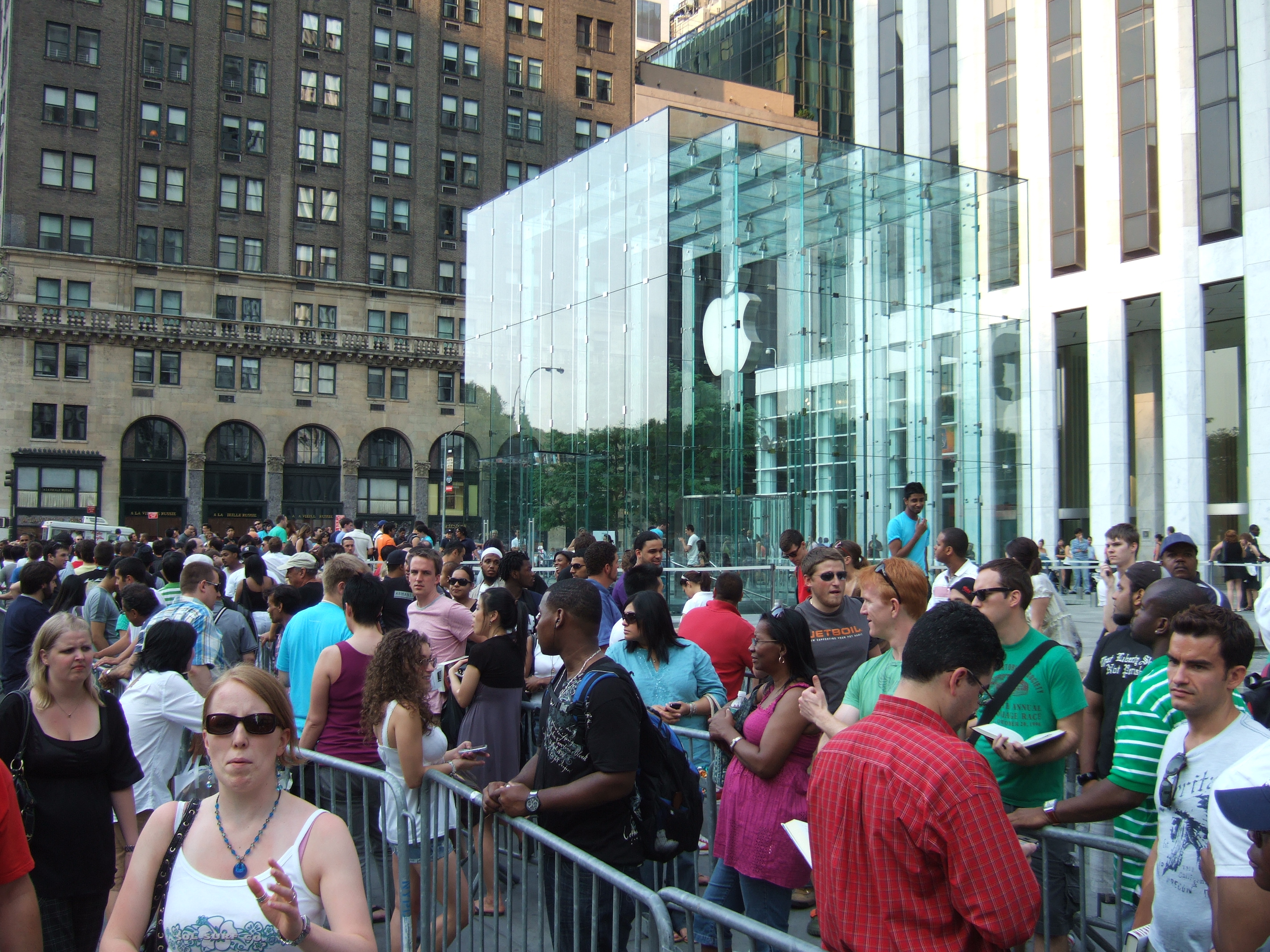
Line of people waiting for the iPhone 3G outside of Apple Fifth Avenue, 2008

Brand loyalty profits firms by saving them money. Benefits for companies associated with loyal consumers include:

- Acceptance of product extensions.
- Defense from competitors' cutting of prices.
- Creating barriers to entry for firms looking to enter the market.
- Competitive edge in market.
- Customers willing to pay high prices or accept far-reaching end user agreements
- Existing customers cost much less to serve.
- Potential new customers.

Generally speaking, brand loyalty will increase profit over time as firms do not have to spend as much time and money on maintaining relationships or marketing to existing consumers. Loyal long-term customers spend more money with a firm.

== Customer behavior ==
Brand loyalty leads not only to repurchasing. Customers may repurchase a brand due to situational constraints (such as vendor lock-in), a lack of viable alternatives, or out of convenience. Such loyalty is referred to as "spurious loyalty".

Previous studies showed that customer loyalty is affected by customer satisfaction, but the association differs based on customer switching costs (procedural, relational, and financial). Real brand loyalty exists when customers have a high relative attitude toward the brand which they then exhibit through repurchase behavior. This type of loyalty can be a great asset to the firm: customers are willing to pay higher prices, they may cost less to serve, and can bring new customers to the firm. For example, if Joe has brand loyalty to Company A, he will purchase Company A's products even if Company B's are cheaper and/or of a higher quality. From the point of view of many marketers, loyalty to the brand — in terms of consumer usage — is a key factor. However, companies often ensure that they are not spending resources to retain loyal but unprofitable customers.

=== Usage rate ===
Most important is usually the 'rate' of usage, to which the Pareto 80-20 rule applies: Kotler's "heavy users" are likely to be disproportionately important to the brand (typically, 20 percent of users accounting for 80 percent of usage — and of suppliers' profit). As a result, suppliers often segment their customers into "heavy", "medium", and "light" users; as far as they can, they target "heavy users". However, research shows that heavy users of a brand are not always the most profitable for a company.

=== Loyalty ===
A second dimension, is whether the customer is committed to the brand. Philip Kotler, again, defines four status of loyalty:

1. Hard-core Loyals — who buy the brand all the time.
2. Split Loyals — loyal to two or three brands.
3. Shifting Loyals — moving from one brand to another.
4. Switchers — with no loyalty (possibly "deal prone", constantly looking for bargains or "vanity prone", looking for something different). Again, research shows that customer commitment is a more nuanced a fine-grained construct than what was previously thought. Specifically, customer commitment has five dimensions, and some commitment dimensions (forced commitment may even negatively impact customer loyalty).

== Psychological reasoning ==
A person's psychological disposition affects which brands they are attracted to. Cognitive responses can be matched with brand personalities. Brand personalities are broken down into five categories of traits: sincerity, ruggedness, competence, sophistication and excitement. Consumers are usually drawn to a brand because the brand strongly conveys one of these traits, and that trait resonates in the consumer's mind. These traits are matched to the five psychological factors that the consumers are influenced by: perception, learning, motivation, beliefs, and attitudes. In relation to brand loyalty, the most important factors are beliefs and attitudes. A belief can be based on real knowledge, faith, or opinion and has the ability to carry an emotional charge. Consumers use beliefs to form a brand image in their minds, and marketers try to either change or enhance people's beliefs to draw them to their brand. Marketers can advertise messages such as "no added sugar" and then, if this statement resonates in the consumer's mind, the consumer will believe that this brand's beliefs matches theirs. Beliefs that consumers hold against brands can also be false, as word of mouth, false advertising, and so forth can create false impressions. Marketers will try to counteract these negative beliefs so the consumer feels like they hold similar beliefs as the brand. Attitudes can be based on brand salience and accessibility. Consumers make constant evaluations on every aspect of their lives and these make up attitudes. Ones attitude is usually difficult to change, so marketers try to fit their brands and products into categorical attitudes. Each time a consumer makes contact with a brand (through advertising and promotion), they reflect on their attitudes to make judgements and decisions about that particular brand. If a person's attitude coincides with what a brand is trying to convey, the consumer will put the brand into a "liking" category in their mind. The consumer will then be more likely to increase involvement with this brand, and because attitudes are difficult to change, the chances of brand loyalty occurring increase.

Other advertising techniques such as comparative advertising have shown to increase the brand attitudes one might have. When a brand praises a competitor, rather than using a negative comparison, consumers are shown to have more positive brand attitudes, therefore drawing them to the brand. Brands may advertise themselves in ways that have nothing to do with their product, but by using emotional influences that they know the average consumer will engage with. For example, they may use religion, world peace, love, death, children and other symbols that humans can feel sentimental about to attract consumers to their brand. Through advertising, marketers may focus more on implicit emotional messages, rather than the actual content or information about their brand. Consumers take notice of campaigns, and a wave effect can occur, due to the relational sense of the campaign to the common person's emotions. Once a consumer establishes an emotional bond with a brand, the consumer is more likely to be able to recall the brand than consumers who have been subject to a large amount of content information. Because of this increased level of recall, brand loyalty is more likely to occur, as the brand name is resonating in the consumer's mind due to a feeling of emotional attachment. Furthermore, consumers are willing to pay more for a product that has a brand name that resonates with them emotionally.

=== High- vs. low-involvement consumers ===
Buying decisions from consumers can be dependent on their level of involvement with the product or brand. Brand loyalty can stem from whether the consumer has a high or low level of involvement with the brand. High-involvement consumers interact with brands and products that are important to them, are risky or expensive and products that people who are important to the consumer have strong opinions on. High-involvement consumers will usually progress through complex buying behavior to decide whether they want to purchase a product whose brand greatly differs from others. Such behavior involves gaining knowledge of the product, specifications and attributes, and furthermore creating attitudes that lead to the buyer's decision. Similarly, dissonance-reducing buying behavior occurs in the same situation, but instead with brands they see little differences between. This process consists of consumers finding purchase convenience, attractive pricing, and shopping around. High-involvement consumers search for more product attributes and engage in more product-related activities, such as searching for more information on a product and researching the brand's background. This engagement makes consumers aware and knowledgeable of the brand's attributes, so this engagement can shape behavioral brand loyalty, as the consumer feels that they know the brand well.

Low-involvement consumers take on habitual buying behavior or variety-seeking behavior. These processes occur when a consumer is purchasing fast-moving goods and requires a low product-involvement level. Habitual behavior occurs when the consumer doesn't see large differences between brands, and therefore doesn't search for information. Consumers usually purchase because advertising or promotion created familiarity. The attitudes formed by being exposed to advertisements and promotions cause brand loyalty to occur. Because consumers do less mental work to assess each brand, they may stick with a brand simply because it takes less work to do so. Low-involvement consumers use short-cut evaluations, so, for example, a known brand name that they haven't thought about deeply enough to find faults in will be an easy buy decision. Habitual buying behavior can result in brand loyalty subconsciously. The consumer isn't actively aware they want to purchase repeatedly from a particular brand, it is just in their habitual nature to do so. Alternatively, low-involvement consumers who are using variety-seeking behavior see differences between brands and tend to do a lot of switching. To attempt to persuade these consumers into habitual buying behavior, marketers will try to dominate shelf space, cut prices, or introduce new products. If a low-involvement consumer continues to use variety-seeking behavior, brand loyalty is unlikely to be established.

=== Factors influencing brand loyalty ===
Loyalty includes some degree of predisposition toward a brand. It is determined by several distinct psychological processes, and it entails multivariate measurements. Customer perceived value, brand trust, customer satisfaction, repeat purchase behavior, and commitment are found to be the key influencing factors of brand loyalty. Commitment and repeated purchase behavior are considered as necessary conditions for brand loyalty followed by perceived value, satisfaction, and brand trust.

Customer–brand identification can also reduce brand switching during market disruption. A longitudinal study of 679 consumers during the launch of the iPhone in Spain found that both identification with and perceived value of an incumbent brand inhibited switching, with customer–brand identification exerting the stronger effect over time.

Fred Reichheld, one of the most influential writers on brand loyalty, claimed that enhancing customer loyalty could have dramatic effects on profitability. However, new research shows that the association between customer loyalty and financial outcomes such as firm profitability and stock-market outcomes is not so straightforward.

An organization's ability to attract and retain customers is vital to its success. Customer loyalty requires a strong appetite by the customer for a product. Marketing tools such as integrated marketing communications (IMC) and branding can increase perceived attraction between the consumer and the brand. These tools boost emotional response and attachment to the brand, and influence feelings the customer has for a brand; both are important for congruency and a relationship. This in turn leads to the development of brand loyalty. Relationship development and maintenance can also be achieved through the use of loyalty programs or a celebrity endorser. These can help to increase a bond between a brand and a consumer.

IMC is defined as "integrating a variety of convincing messages across various forms to communicate with and develop relationships with customers." IMC can convey the brand image, increase awareness, build brand equity, and achieve shared values between the consumer and the brand.

=== IMC and brand loyalty ===
IMC and branding are both marketing tools for increasing the brand loyalty of consumers. The decisions made around communications and branding should be based on solid and factual market research about the consumers. If the brand or the IMC do not seem to be relevant to the target market, consumers will not pay attention. An example of this is that high customization, creativity, and a more direct voice is recommended for messages directed towards Generation Y consumers as Generation Y want to be treated differently from the rest of the market and marketers should acknowledge this.

Loyalty programs reward and encourage customers, which is necessary for customers to want to repurchase. The consumer should feel a connection with the brand to want repeat purchase and to exhibit other brand loyalty behaviors such as positive word of mouth. "A loyalty program is an integrated system of marketing actions that aims to make member customers more loyal to a brand." The main goal of a loyalty program is to create or enhance customer loyalty towards a brand whilst being sustained even after a loyalty program is discontinued.

Marketers use such tactics as a loyalty program to increase likelihood of repeat purchase and to retrieve information about the spending habits of the consumer. Loyalty programs that enhance the consumer's opinion about how much the firm can offer them may be essential for building a relationship. Even though these programs can cost a lot of money, they help to create a relationship between the brand and the consumer. An example of a loyalty program is a point system: Frequent customers earn points which transform into freebies, discounts, rewards, or special treatment of some sort; customers work toward a specific number of points to redeem their benefit.

Celebrity endorsers moderate the relationship between the consumer and the brand by personifying the brand to match the perceptions of the consumer. Using a celebrity endorser can build a relationship between consumers and a brand because endorsers can represent similarities between themselves and the consumer, and themselves and the brand. Celebrities make marketing tactics more convincing and marketing communications more effective.

For example, a celebrity may be influential to a Generation Y consumer because that generation views them as likeable, real, and beautiful. In order for celebrity endorsers to effectively reach the audience, they must connect and identify with the audience. The use of a popular celebrity endorser could personalize the brand for the consumer and create the relationship between the consumer and the brand. To ensure endorsement is successful, the celebrity should match the brand and the consumer. The effect of using a celebrity endorser that consumers look up to and want to emulate can lead to increased congruence between the values of the consumers and the brand, and improve the relationship between the two.

=== Portfolios of brands ===
Andrew Ehrenberg, then of the London Business School said that consumers buy "portfolios of brands". They switch regularly between brands, often because they simply want a change. Thus, "brand penetration" or "brand share" reflects only a statistical chance that customers will buy that brand next time as part of a portfolio of brands they prefer. It does not guarantee that they will stay loyal.

Influencing the statistical probabilities facing a consumer choosing from a portfolio of preferred brands, which is required in this context, is a very different role for a brand manager; compared with the much simpler one, traditionally described, of recruiting and holding dedicated customers. The concept also emphasizes the need for managing continuity.

=== Other issues ===
Once brands have become established and have a steady flow of consumers, problems may arise such as slips in product quality or in safety of products, or lack of customer care. Such problems can be detrimental to a brand that has become too confident. Many brands continue to get away with scandals, and it does not affect their image in any way. For example, the Coca-Cola brand has been involved in scandals including murders in Colombia, crimes in India, and various health dangers all of which relate back to the company name. Yet the power of the Coca-Cola brand puts it at the top of its field. The reputation of such an organization is sometimes slow to negatively change with the powerful distribution rights and funds to create some of the most effective ad campaigns.

== Loyalty in business markets ==
In industrial and other business markets, Yoram Wind noted in 1970 that at the time, source loyalty among industrial buyers had not received the level of academic interest paid to consumer brand loyalty. A study he conducted on loyalty in the purchase of electronic components on the United States west coast found "substantial evidence" that buyers in that sector remained loyal to certain brands.

Some organizations may regard "heavy users" as "major accounts" to be handled by senior sales personnel and managers; whereas "light users" may be handled by the general sales force or by a dealer.

== See also ==
- Brand architecture
- Brand aversion
- Brand equity
- Brand management
- Brand language
- Brand tribalism
- Customer engagement
- Customer franchise
- Employer branding
- Evangelism marketing
- Visual brand language
- Brand intimacy

== Sources ==
- Eryigit, Canan (1 January 2013). "The Influence of Brand Associations on Brand Loyalty in Accordance with Product Involvement". Choregia. 9 (2): 17–33. ISSN 1791-4027.
- Heath, Robert; Brandt, David; Nairn, Agnes (December 2006). "Brand Relationships: Strengthened by Emotion, Weakened by Attention". Journal of Advertising Research. 46 (4): 410–419. doi:10.2501/S002184990606048X. S2CID 54530013.
- Kim, Junghyun; Ah Yu, Eun (18 February 2016). "The Holistic Brand Experience of Branded Mobile Applications Affects Brand Loyalty". Social Behavior and Personality. 44 (1): 77–87. doi:10.2224/sbp.2016.44.1.77.
- Kotler, P., 'Marketing Management ' (Prentice-Hall, 7th edn, 1991)
- Kotler, Philip; Burton, Suzan; Deans, Kenneth R.; Brown, Linden; Armstrong, Gary M. (2013). Marketing. Frenchs Forest, New South Wales: Pearson Australia. ISBN 978-1-4425-4942-5.
- Jacoby, J. and Chestnut, R.W., 1978, Brand Loyalty: Measurement Management (John Wiley & Sons, New York).
- Lin, Grace T.R.; Chia-Chi, S. (2009). "Factors influencing satisfaction and loyalty in online shopping: An integrated model". Online Information Review. 33 (3): 458–475. doi:10.1108/14684520910969907. S2CID 1005692.
- Lazarevic, V (2012). "Encouraging brand loyalty in fickle generation Y consumers". Young Consumers. 13 (1): 45–61. doi:10.1108/17473611211203939.
- Liljander, V.; Gummerus, J.; Söderlund, M. (2015). "Young consumers' responses to suspected covert and overt blog marketing". Internet Research. 25 (4): 610–632. doi:10.1108/intr-02-2014-0041.
- Ludin, I. H. B. H.; Cheng, B. L. (2014). "Factors influencing customer satisfaction and E-loyalty: Online shopping environment among the young adults". Management Dynamics in the Knowledge Economy. 2 (3): 462–471.
- Melnyk, V.; Bijmolt, T. (2015). "The effects of introducing and terminating loyalty programs" (PDF). European Journal of Marketing. 49 (3): 398–419. doi:10.1108/ejm-12-2012-0694.
- Pauwels-delassus, V.; Mogos Descotes, R. (2013). "Brand name change: Can trust and loyalty be transferred?". Journal of Brand Management. 20 (8): 656–669. doi:10.1057/bm.2013.7. S2CID 167990730.
- Posavac, Steven S.; Sanbonmatsu, David M.; Seo, Joon Young; Iacobucci, Dawn (October 2014). "How Attitudes Toward Product Categories Drive Individual Brand Attitudes and Choice: ATTITUDES TOWARD PRODUCT CATEGORIES". Psychology & Marketing. 31 (10): 843–852. doi:10.1002/mar.20738.
- Schivinski, B.; Dabrowski, D. (2015). "The impact of brand communication on brand equity through facebook" (PDF). Journal of Research in Interactive Marketing. 9 (1): 31–53. doi:10.1108/jrim-02-2014-0007.
- So, J. T.; Andrew, G. P.; Yap, S. (2013). "Corporate branding, emotional attachment and brand loyalty: The case of luxury fashion branding". Journal of Fashion Marketing and Management. 17 (4): 403–423. doi:10.1108/JFMM-03-2013-0032.
