= Brand management =

Process in brand marketing

In marketing, brand management refers to the process of controlling how a brand is perceived in the market. Tangible elements of brand management include the look, price, and packaging of the product itself; intangible elements are the experiences that the target markets share with the brand and the relationships they have with it. A brand manager oversees all aspects of the consumer's brand association as well as relationships with members of the supply chain. Developing a good relationship with target markets is essential for brand management.

== Definitions ==
In 2001, Hislop defined branding as "the process of creating a relationship or a connection between a company's product and emotional perception of the customer for the purpose of generating segregation among competition and building loyalty among customers". In 2004 and 2008, Kapferer and Keller respectively defined it as a fulfillment in customer expectations and consistent customer satisfaction.

Brand management uses an array of marketing tools and techniques in order to increase the perceived value of a product (see: Brand equity). Based on the aims of the established marketing strategy, brand management enables the price of products to grow and builds loyal customers through positive associations and images or a strong awareness of the brand.

Brand management is the process of identifying the core value of a particular brand and reflecting the core value among the targeted customers. In modern terms, a brand could be corporate, product, service, or person. Brand management builds brand credibility, and credible brands can build brand loyalty, bounce back from circumstantial crisis, and can benefit from price-sensitive customers.

== History ==
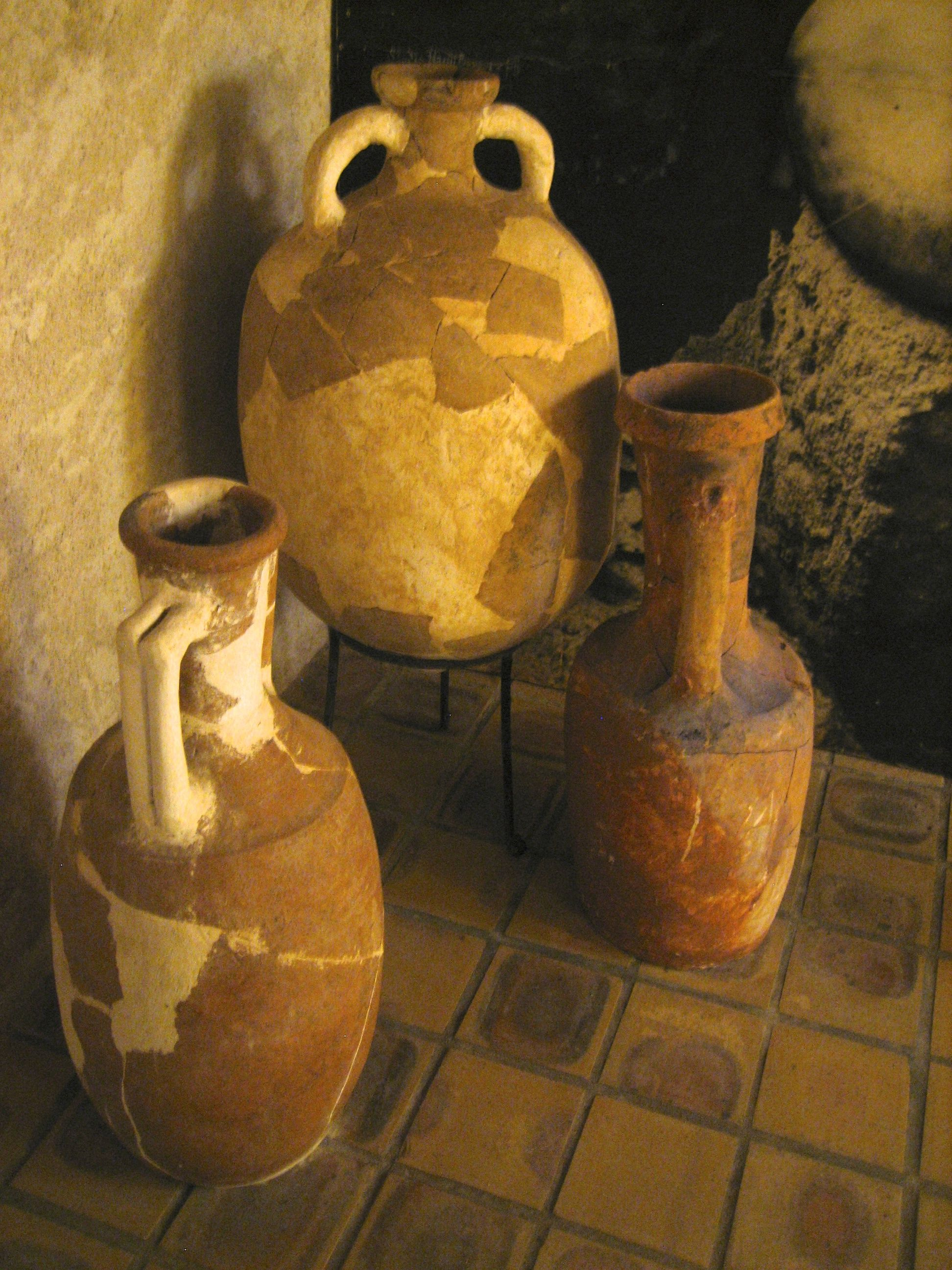
In pre-literate societies, the distinctive shape of amphorae served some of the functions of a label, communicating information about region of origin, the name of the producer and may have carried product quality claims.

The earliest origins of branding can be traced to pre-historic times. The practice may have first begun with the branding of farm animals in the middle East in the Neolithic period. Stone Age and Bronze Age cave paintings depict images of branded cattle. Egyptian funerary artwork also depicts branded animals. Over time, the practice was extended to marking personal property such as pottery or tools, and eventually some type of brand or insignia was attached to goods intended for trade.

Around 4,000 years ago, producers began by attaching simple stone seals to products which, over time, were transformed into clay seals bearing impressed images, often associated with the producer's personal identity thus giving the product a personality. Bevan and Wengrow have argued that branding became necessary following the urban revolution in ancient Mesopotamia in the 4th century BCE, when large-scale economies started mass-producing commodities such as alcoholic drinks, cosmetics and textiles. These ancient societies imposed strict forms of quality control over commodities, and also needed to convey value to the consumer through branding. Diana Twede has argued that the "consumer packaging functions of protection, utility and communication have been necessary whenever packages were the object of transactions" (p. 107). She has shown that amphorae used in Mediterranean trade between 1500 and 500 BCE exhibited a wide variety of shapes and markings, which provided information for purchasers during exchange. Systematic use of stamped labels dates from around the fourth century BCE. In a largely pre-literate society, the shape of the amphora and its pictorial markings functioned as a brand, conveying information about the contents, region of origin and even the identity of the producer which were understood to convey information about product quality.

A number of archaeological research studies have found extensive evidence of branding, packaging and labelling in antiquity. Archaeologists have identified some 1,000 different Roman potters' marks of the early Roman Empire, suggesting that branding was a relatively widespread practice.

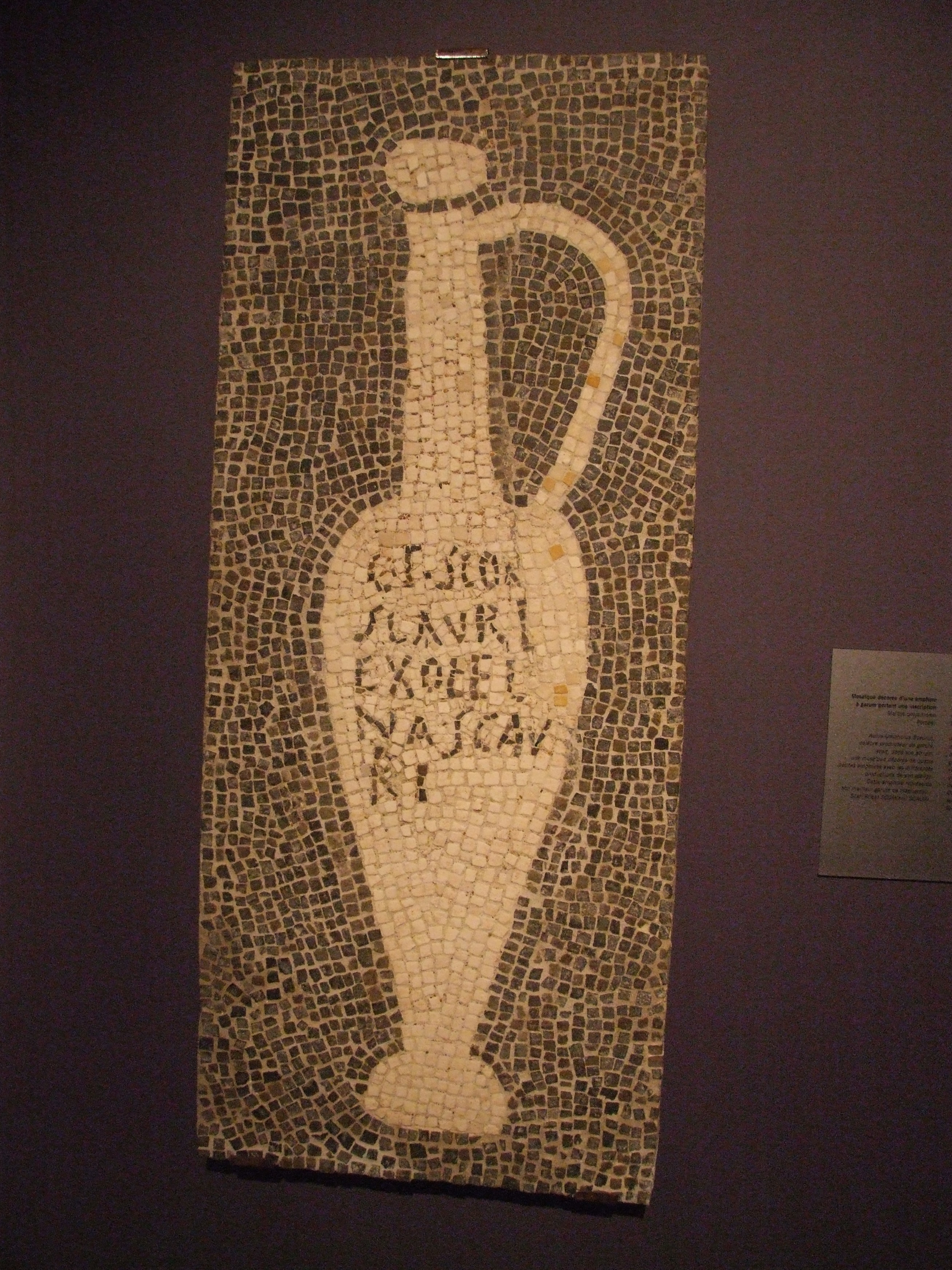
Mosaic showing garum container, from the house of Umbricius Scaurus of Pompeii. The inscription which reads "G(ari) F(los) SCO(mbri) SCAURI EX OFFI(CI)NA SCAURI" has been translated as "The flower of garum, made of the mackerel, a product of Scaurus, from the shop of Scaurus".

In Pompeii (circa 35 CE), Umbricius Scauras, a manufacturer of fish sauce (also known as garum) was branding his amphora which travelled across the entire Mediterranean. Mosaic patterns in the atrium of his house were decorated with images of amphora bearing his personal brand and quality claims. The mosaic comprises four different amphora, one at each corner of the atrium, and bearing labels as follows:

1. G(ari) F(los) SCO[m]/ SCAURI/ EX OFFI[ci]/NA SCAU/RI Translated as "The flower of garum, made of the mackerel, a product of Scaurus, from the shop of Scaurus"
2. LIQU[minis]/ FLOS Translated as: "The flower of Liquamen"
3. G[ari] F[los] SCOM[bri]/ SCAURI Translated as: "The flower of garum, made of the mackerel, a product of Scaurus"
4. LIQUAMEN/ OPTIMUM/ EX OFFICI[n]/A SCAURI Translated as: "The best liquamen, from the shop of Scaurus"

Scauras' fish sauce was known to be of very high quality across the Mediterranean and its reputation travelled as far away as modern France. Curtis has described this mosaic as "an advertisement... and a rare, unequivocal example of a motif inspired by a patron, rather than by the artist".

In Pompeii and nearby Herculaneum, archaeological evidence also points to evidence of branding and labelling in relatively common use. Wine jars, for example, were stamped with names, such as "Lassius" and "L. Eumachius;" probably references to the name of the producer. Carbonized loaves of bread, found at Herculaneum, indicate that some bakers stamped their bread with the producer's name and other information including the use, price or intended recipient. These markings demonstrate the public's need for product information in an increasingly complex marketplace.

In the East, evidence of branding also dates to an early period. Recent research suggests that Chinese merchants made extensive use of branding, packaging, advertising and retail signage. From as early as 200 BCE, Chinese packaging and branding was used to signal family, place names and product quality, and the use of government imposed product branding was used between 600 and 900 AD. Eckhart and Bengtsson have argued that during the Song dynasty (960–1127), Chinese society developed a consumerist culture, where a high level of consumption was attainable for a wide variety of ordinary consumers rather than just the elite (p. 212). The rise of a consumer culture led to the commercial investment in carefully managed company image, retail signage, symbolic brands, trademark protection and the brand concepts of baoji, hao, lei, gongpin, piazi and pinpai, which roughly equate with Western concepts of family status, quality grading, and upholding traditional Chinese values (p. 219). Eckhardt and Bengtsson's analysis suggests that brands emerged in China as a result of the social needs and tensions implicit in consumer culture, in which brands provide social status and stratification. Thus, the evolution of brands in China stands in sharp contrast to the West where manufacturers pushed brands onto the market in order to differentiate, increase market share and ultimately profits (pp 218–219). In Japan, branding has a long heritage. For many Japanese businesses, a "mon" or seal is an East Asian form of brand or trademark.

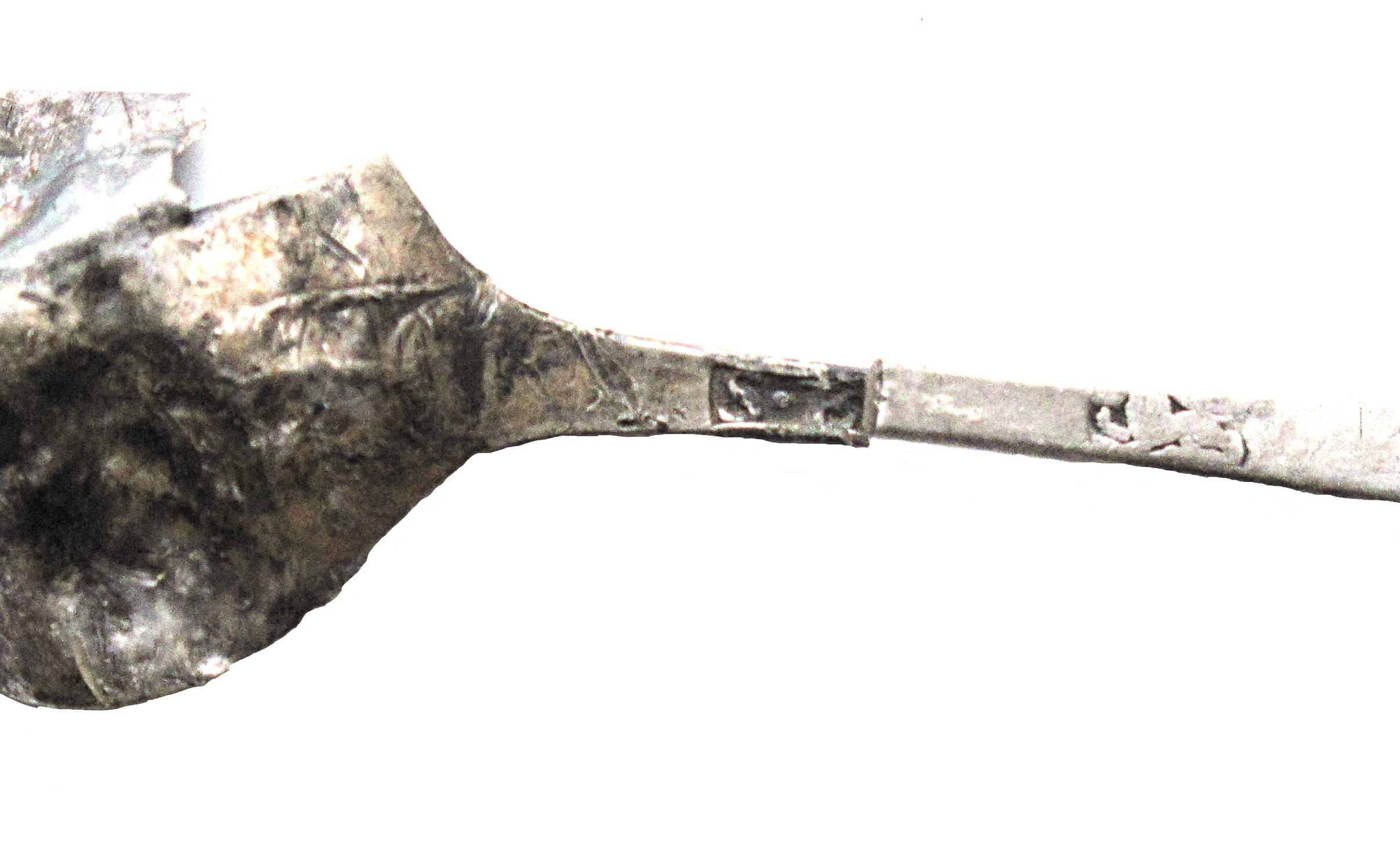
Hallmark on an English silver spoon, 18th century

Not all historians agree that the distinctive packages and markings used in antiquity can be compared with modern brands or labels. Moore and Reid, for example, have argued that the distinctive shapes and markings in ancient containers should be termed proto-brands rather than seen as modern brands according to our modern understanding. A proto-brand is one that possesses at least one of three characteristics; place – information about the origin of manufacture-expressed by a mark, signature or even by the physical properties of the raw materials including the packaging materials, performs a basic marketing function such as storage, transportation and assortment; and quality attributes- information about the product's quality expressed by the name of the manufacturer, place of origin or ingredients or any other generally accepted indicator of quality.

The impetus for more widespread branding was often provided by government laws, requiring producers to meet minimum quality specifications or to standardize weights and measures, which in turn, was driven by public concerns about quality and fairness in exchange. The use of hallmarks, applied to precious metal objects, was well in place by the 4th century CE in Byzantium. Evidence of marked silver bars dates to around 350 CE, and represents one of the oldest known forms of consumer protection. Hundreds of silver objects, including chalices, cups, plates, rings and bullion, all bearing hallmarks from the early Byzantine period, have been found and documented. Hallmarks for silver and gold were introduced in Britain in 1300.

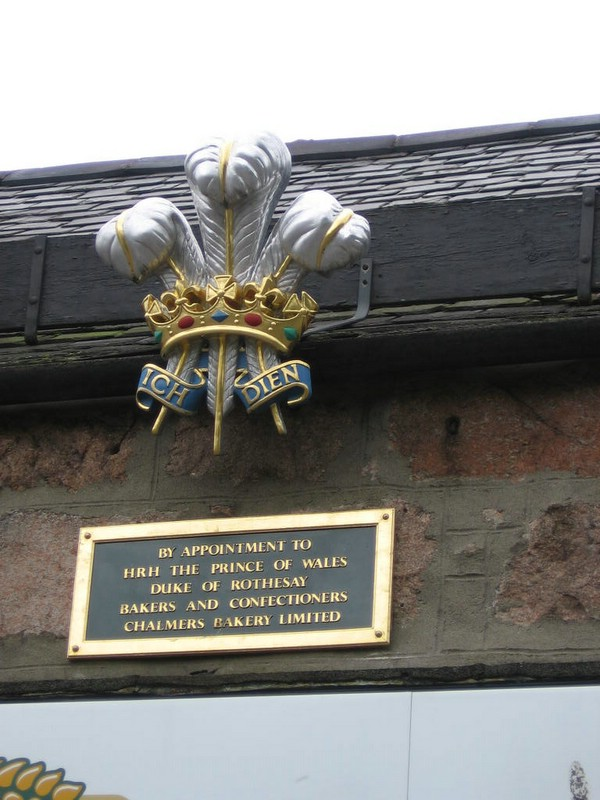
By the 18th century, manufacturers began displaying a royal warrant on their premises and on their packaging.

In medieval Europe, branding was applied to a broader range of goods and services. Craft guilds, which sprang up across Europe around this time, codified and reinforced systems of marking products to ensure quality and standards. Bread-makers, silversmiths and goldsmiths all marked their wares during this period. By 1266, English bakers were required by law to put a symbol on each product they sold. Bricui et al. have argued that the number of different forms of brands blossomed from the 14th century following the period of European discovery and expansion. Some individual brand marks have been in continuous use for centuries. The brand Staffelter Hof, for example, dates to 862 or earlier and the company still produces wine under its name today.

The granting a royal charter to tradesmen, markets and fairs was practiced across Europe from the early medieval period. At a time when concerns about product quality were major public issues, a royal endorsement provided the public with a signal that the holder supplied goods worthy of use in the royal household, and by implication inspired public confidence. In the 15th century, a royal warrant of appointment replaced the royal charter in England. The Lord Chamberlain of England formally appointed tradespeople as suppliers to the royal household. The printer William Caxton, for example, was one of the earliest recipients of a royal warrant when he became the King's printer in 1476. By the 18th century, mass-market manufacturers such as Josiah Wedgewood and Matthew Boulton recognized the value of supplying royalty, often at prices well below cost, for the sake of the publicity and kudos it generated. Many manufacturers began actively displaying the royal arms on their premises, packaging and labelling. By 1840, the rules surrounding the display of royal arms were tightened to prevent fraudulent claims. By the early 19th century, the number of royal warrants granted rose rapidly when Queen Victoria granted some 2,000 royal warrants during her reign of 64 years.

By the eighteenth century, as standards of living improved and an emerging middle class began to demand more luxury goods and services, the retail landscape underwent major changes. Retailers were tending to specialize in specific goods or services and began to exhibit a variety of modern marketing techniques. Stores not only began to brand themselves, but also displayed branded goods, both in the glazed shop windows to attract passers-by and display counters to appeal to patrons inside the store. Branding was more widely used in the 19th century, following the industrial revolution, and the development of new professions like marketing, manufacturing and business management formalized the study of brands and branding as a key business activity. Branding is a way of differentiating product from mere commercial products, and therefore the use of branding expanded with each advance in transportation, communication, and trade. The modern discipline of brand management is considered to have been started by a memo at Procter & Gamble by Neil H. McElroy.

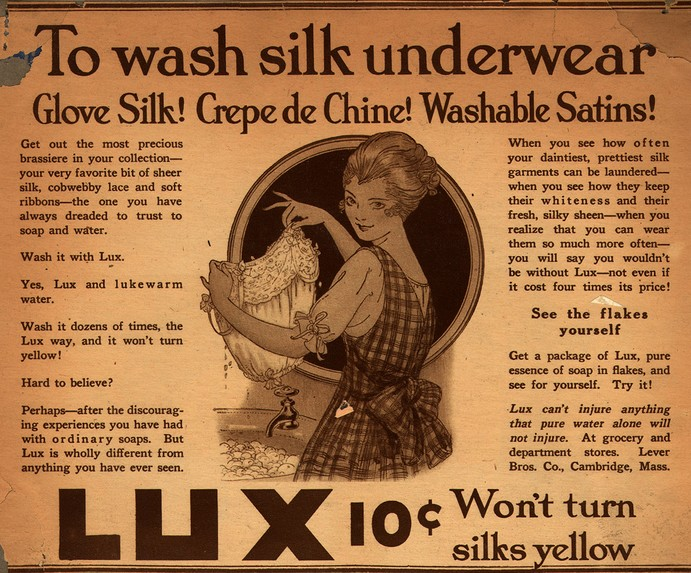
Lux, print advertisement, 1916. Lux was 'positioned' as the soap for all fine fabrics.

With the rise of mass media in the early 20th century, companies soon adopted techniques that would allow their advertising messages to stand out; slogans, mascots, and jingles began to appear on radio in the 1920s and early television in the 1930s. Many of the earliest radio drama series were sponsored by soap manufacturers and the genre became known as a soap opera. Before long, radio station owners realized they could increase advertising revenue by selling 'air-time' in small time allocations which could be sold to multiple businesses. By the 1930s, these advertising spots, as the packets of time became known, were being sold by the station's geographical sales representatives, ushering in an era of national radio advertising.

From the first decades of the 20th century, advertisers began to focus on developing brand personality, brand image and brand identity—concepts. The British advertising agency W. S. Crawford's Ltd began to use the concept of 'product personality' and the 'advertising idea' arguing that in order to stimulate sales and create a 'buying habit', advertising had to 'build a definitive association of ideas round the goods'. In the United States, advertising agency J. Walter Thompson company (JWT) was pioneering similar concepts of brand personality and brand image. The notion of a 'brand personality' was developed independently and simultaneously in both the United States and Britain. For example, in 1915 JWT acquired the advertising account for Lux soap and recommended that the traditional positioning as a product for woolen garments should be broadened so that consumers would see it as a soap for use on all fine fabrics in the household. To implement, Lux was repositioned with a more up-market posture, and began a long association with expensive clothing and high fashion. Cano has argued that the positioning strategy JWT used for Lux exhibited an insightful understanding of the way that consumers mentally construct brand images. JWT recognized that advertising effectively manipulated socially shared symbols. In the case of Lux, the brand disconnected from images of household drudgery, and connected with images of leisure and fashion.

By the 1940s, manufacturers began to recognize the way in which consumers were developing relationships with their brands in a social/psychological/anthropological sense. Advertisers began to use motivational research and consumer research to gather insights into consumer purchasing. Strong branded campaigns for Chrysler and Exxon/Esso, using insights drawn research methods from psychology and cultural anthropology, led to some of most enduring campaigns of the 20th century. Esso's "Put a Tiger in Your Tank" campaign was based on a tiger mascot used in Scandinavia at the turn of last century, and first appeared as a global advertising slogan in the 1950s and 1960s, and subsequently reappeared in the 1990s. Throughout the late 20th century, brand advertisers began to imbue goods and services with a personality, based on the insight that consumers searched for brands with personalities that matched their own.

== Global brands ==
Interbrand's 2020 top-10 global brands are Apple, Amazon, Microsoft, Google, Samsung, Coca-Cola, Toyota, Mercedes-Benz, McDonald's, and Disney.

Interbrand's Top Ten Global Brands (by brand value), 2020
| Rank | Logo | Brand | Value ($m) |
| 1 | | Apple | 322,999 |
| 2 | | Amazon | 200,667 |
| 3 | | Microsoft | 166,001 |
| 4 | | Google | 165,444 |
| 5 | | Samsung | 62,289 |
| 6 | | Coca-Cola | 56,894 |
| 7 | | Toyota | 51,595 |
| 8 | | Mercedes-Benz | 49,268 |
| 9 | | McDonald's | 42,816 |
| 10 | | Disney | 40,773 |

The split between commodities/food services and technology is not a matter of chance: both industrial sectors rely heavily on sales to the individual consumer who must be able to rely on cleanliness/quality or reliability/value, respectively. For this reason, industries such as agricultural (which sells to other companies in the food sector), student loans (which have a relationship with universities/schools rather than the individual loan-taker), and electricity (which is generally a controlled monopoly) have less prominent and less recognized branding. Brand value, moreover, is not simply a fuzzy feeling of "consumer appeal", but an actual quantitative value of good will under Generally Accepted Accounting Principles. Companies will rigorously defend their brand name, including prosecution of trademark infringement. Occasionally trademarks may differ across countries.

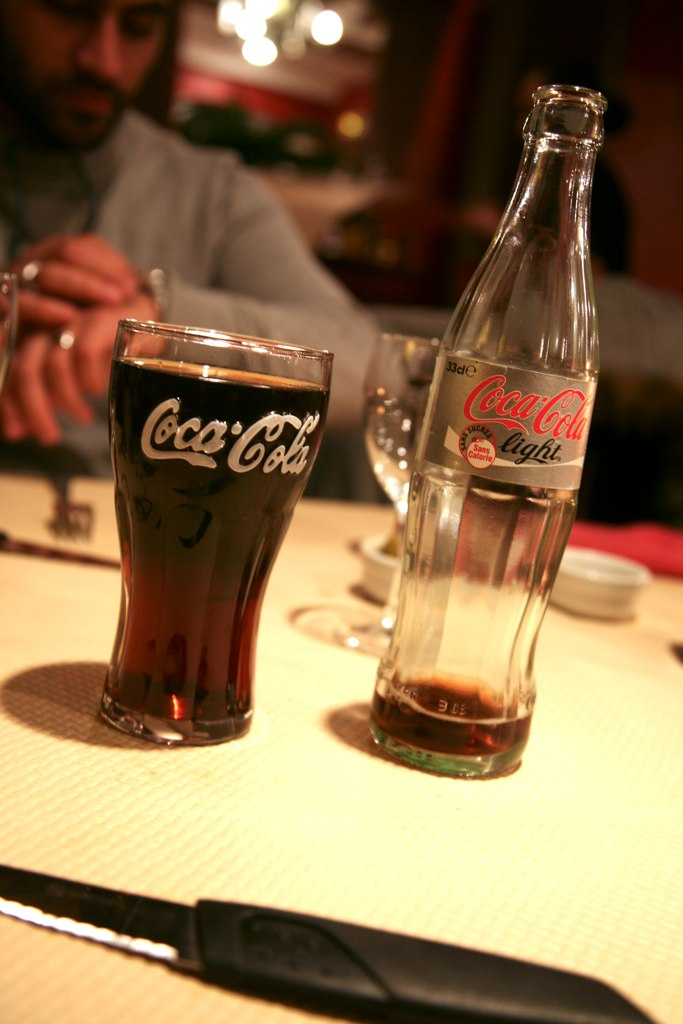
The distinctive red color, custom-designed Spencerian script and the shape of the bottle make Coca-Cola one of the most recognizable brands globally.

Among the most highly visible and recognizable brands is the script and logo for Coca-Cola products. Despite numerous blind tests indicating that Coke's flavor is not preferred, Coca-Cola continues to enjoy a dominant share of the cola market. Coca-Cola's history is so replete with uncertainty that a folklore has sprung up around the brand, including the (refuted) myth that Coca-Cola invented the red-dressed Santa-Claus which is used to gain market entry in less capitalistic regions in the world such as the former Soviet Union and China, and such brand-management stories as "Coca-Cola's first entry into the Chinese market resulted in their brand being translated as 'bite the wax tadpole'". Brand management science is replete with such stories, including the Chevrolet 'Nova' or "it doesn't go" in Spanish, and proper cultural translation is useful to companies entering new markets.

Modern brand management also intersects with legal issues such as 'genericization of trademark.' The 'Xerox' Company continues to fight heavily in media whenever a reporter or other writer uses 'xerox' as simply a synonym for 'photocopy.' Should usage of 'xerox' be accepted as the standard American English term for 'photocopy,' then Xerox's competitors could successfully argue in court that they are permitted to create 'xerox' machines as well. Yet, in a sense, reaching this stage of market domination is itself a triumph of brand management, in that becoming so dominant typically involves strong profit.

== Branding terminology ==
Brand attitude refers to the "buyer's overall evaluation of a brand with respect to its perceived ability to meet a currently relevant motivation".

Brand associations refers to a set of information nodes held in memory that form a network of associations and are linked to a key variable. For example, variables such as brand image, brand personality, brand attitude, brand preference are nodes within a network that describes the sources of brand-self congruity. In another example, the variables brand recognition and brand recall form a linked network that describes the consumer's brand awareness or brand knowledge.

Brand awareness refers to the extent to which consumers can identify a brand under various conditions. Marketers typically identify two distinct types of brand awareness; namely brand recognition and brand recall. Brand recognition refers to how easily the consumers can associate a brand based on the company's logo, slogan, color scheme, or other visual element, without seeing the company's name.

Brand collaborations refer to the short-lived or ephemeral "partnerships between brands in which their images, legacies and values intertwine."^{p.13} Brand collaborations can be unconventional when brands partner with other brands or designers seemingly on the opposite spectrum in terms of design, esthetics, positioning and values.

Brand equity Within the literature, it is possible to identify two distinct definitions of brand equity. Firstly an accounting definition suggests that brand equity is a measure of the financial value of a brand and attempts to measure the net additional inflows as a result of the brand or the value of the intangible asset of the brand. A different definition comes from marketing where brand equity is treated as a measure of the strength of consumers' attachment to a brand; a description of the associations and beliefs the consumer has about the brand.

Brand image refers to an image an organization wants to project; a psychological meaning or meaning profile associated with a brand.

Brand loyalty refers to the feelings of attachment a consumer forms with a brand. It is a tendency of consumers to purchase repeatedly from a specific brand.

Brand personality refers to "the set of human personality traits that are both applicable to and relevant for brands".

Brand preference refers to "consumers' predisposition towards certain brands that summarize their cognitive information processing towards brand stimuli".

Brand trust refers to whether customers expect the brand to do what is right. 81% of consumers from different markets identified this as a deciding factor in their purchases.

Self-brand congruity draws on the notion that consumers prefer brands with personalities that are congruent with their own; consumers tend to form strong attachments with brands where the brand personality matches their own.

== Brand orientation ==
Brand orientation refers to "the degree to which the organization values brands and its practices are oriented towards building brand capabilities". It is a deliberate approach to working with brands, both internally and externally. The most important driving force behind this increased interest in strong brands is the accelerating pace of globalization. This has resulted in an ever-tougher competitive situation on many markets. A product's superiority is in itself no longer sufficient to guarantee its success. The fast pace of technological development and the increased speed with which imitations turn up on the market have dramatically shortened product lifecycles. The consequence is that product-related competitive advantages soon risk being transformed into competitive prerequisites. For this reason, increasing numbers of companies are looking for other, more enduring, competitive tools – such as brands.

== Justification ==
Brand management aims to create an emotional connection between products, companies and their customers and constituents. Brand managers & Marketing managers may try to control the brand image.

Brand managers create strategies to convert a suspect to prospect, prospect to buyer, buyer to customer, and customer to brand advocates.

== Approaches ==
"By Appointment to His Royal Majesty" was a registered and limited list of approved brands suitable for supply to the British royal family.

Some believe brand managers can be counter-productive, due to their short-term focus.

On the other end of the extreme, luxury and high-end premium brands may create advertisements or sponsor teams merely for the "overall feeling" or goodwill generated. A typical "no-brand" advertisement might simply put up the price (and indeed, brand managers may patrol retail outlets for using their name in discount/clearance sales), whereas on the other end of the extreme a perfume brand might be created that does not show the actual use of the perfume or Breitling may sponsor an aerobatics team purely for the "image" created by such sponsorship. Space travel and brand management for this reason also enjoys a special relationship.

"Nation branding" is a modern term conflating foreign relations and the idea of a brand. An example is Cool Britannia of the 1990s.

== Social media ==
Even though social media has changed the tactics of marketing brands, its primary goals remain the same; to attract and retain customers. However, companies have now experienced a new challenge with the introduction of social media. This change is finding the right balance between empowering customers to spread the word about the brand through viral platforms, while still controlling the company's own core strategic marketing goals. Word-of-mouth marketing via social media, falls under the category of viral marketing, which broadly describes any strategy that encourages individuals to propagate a message, thus, creating the potential for exponential growth in the message's exposure and influence. Basic forms of this are seen when a customer makes a statement about a product or company or endorses a brand. This marketing technique allows users to spread the word on the brand which creates exposure for the company. Because of this, brands have become interested in exploring or using social media for commercial benefit.

== Brand heritage ==
Brands with heritage are not simply associated with antiquated organizations; rather, they actively extol values and position themselves in relation to their heritage. Brands offer multiple benefits to organizations at various market levels, reflecting the entire experiential process afforded to consumers. In the case of voluntary organizations if they can unlock their brand heritage and it will improve volunteer engagement, to the extent that organizations 'with a long history, core values, positive track record, and use of symbols possess, whether consciously or not, an inherent advantage in an increasingly competitive landscape'. In the luxury literature, heritage is distinctly recognized as an integral component of a luxury brand's identity. In the context of tourism preconceived notions of brand heritage stimulate the increased experience of existential authenticity, increasing satisfaction with the visitor experience. For consumer goods the communication of continuity of the brand promise can increase perceived brand authenticity. Heritage brands are characterized by their distinctive capacity to seamlessly integrate past, present, and future temporal dimensions.

== See also ==
- Advertising management
- Brand
- Brand ambassador
- Brand architecture
- Brand awareness
- Brand engagement
- Brand equity
- Brand extension
- Brand implementation
- Challenger brand
- Chief brand officer
- Co-branding
- Consumer behaviour
- Corporate branding
- Disruptor brand
- Employer branding
- Faith branding
- Generic trademark
- Hallmark
- History of marketing
- Individual branding
- Internet branding
- Nation branding
- Outline of management
- Personal branding
- Place branding
- Rebranding
- Return on brand
- School branding
- Semantic Brand Score
- Silver hallmarks
- Social media
- Trademark dilution
- Visual brand language

== Bibliography ==
- Naomi Klein. No Logo. Picador USA, 2009.
- Wally Olins. The Brands Handbook. Thames & Hudson, 2008.
- Wally Olins. On B®and. Thames & Hudson, 2005.
