= Mayson =

Mayson is a surname. It may refer to:

== List of people with the surname ==
- Ginger Mayson (1954/5–2023), American volleyball coach
- Henry Mayson (born c. 1835), American politician from Mississippi
- H. Irving Mayson (1925–1995), American episcopalian suffragan bishop
- Isabella Mayson (1836–1865), British author, better known as Isabella Beeton
- Jacob Mayson (1808–1881), Norwegian-Danish actor manager
- Jon Mayson (born 1945), New Zealand shipping executive and politician
- Richard Mayson (born 1941), New Zealand politician
- Richard Mayson (writer) (born 1961), British author and wine expert
- Tom Mayson (Canadian football) (1928–2010), Canadian football player
- Tom Fletcher Mayson (1893–1958), British recipient of the Victoria Cross
- Tommy Mayson (1886–1972), British footballer
- Trapeta Mayson (born 1967), Liberian poet and teacher
- Vic Mayson, Canadian football player
- Walter Henry Mayson (1835–1904), English violin maker

== See also ==
- Mayson (horse), British Thoroughbred racehorse
- Mason (surname)
