= Edmund Penning-Rowsell =

British journalist

Edmund Lionel Penning-Rowsell (1913–2002) was a British journalist considered the doyen of Britain's writers on wine, and possibly the world's longest-serving wine correspondent.

== Biography ==
Rowsell came from an upper middle class London family. Canon Thomas Rowsell was his second great uncle by blood and the architect Sir Charles Barry was his second great uncle through marriage. During the Depression years, his father's printing business went bankrupt, his education at Marlborough was cut short. He joined The Morning Post of London in 1930, and in 1935 he moved into publishing.

His interest in wine was stimulated by a wedding gift in 1937 of membership of the Wine Society, his love for wine sparked by a tasting of the 1923 Château Talbot. He later became the Wine Society's longest-serving chairman, from 1964 to 1987. Aided by those in the trade he gradually built up his knowledge and wine came to dominate his life.

In 1954, he started writing a column about wine for Country Life, the first of many such enterprises. For 23 years, he was a wine columnist for Financial Times, and also wrote wine articles for Marxism Today. His speciality was the wines of Bordeaux, where his expertise was recognised, and which provided the subject of his magnum opus The Wines of Bordeaux, considered a masterpiece of research.

Michael Broadbent noted that Penning-Rowsell had one of the best private wine collections in England. Working with Broadbent, he became an adviser on wine to auctioneers Christie's, and regularly reported on wine auction results.

Penning-Rowsell was awarded by the French government the Ordre National du Mérite Agricole in 1971 and the Ordre du Mérite National in 1981. He was known for using the phrase, "Speaking as a man of the Left...".

== Bibliography ==
- Red, White and Rosé (1967)
- The Wines of Bordeaux (1969)
- Château Latour: The History of a Great Vineyard 1331-1992 (1993)

== See also ==
- List of wine personalities
