= Royal Albert Hall =

Concert hall in South Kensington, London, England

Coordinates: 51.5011°N 0.1774°W

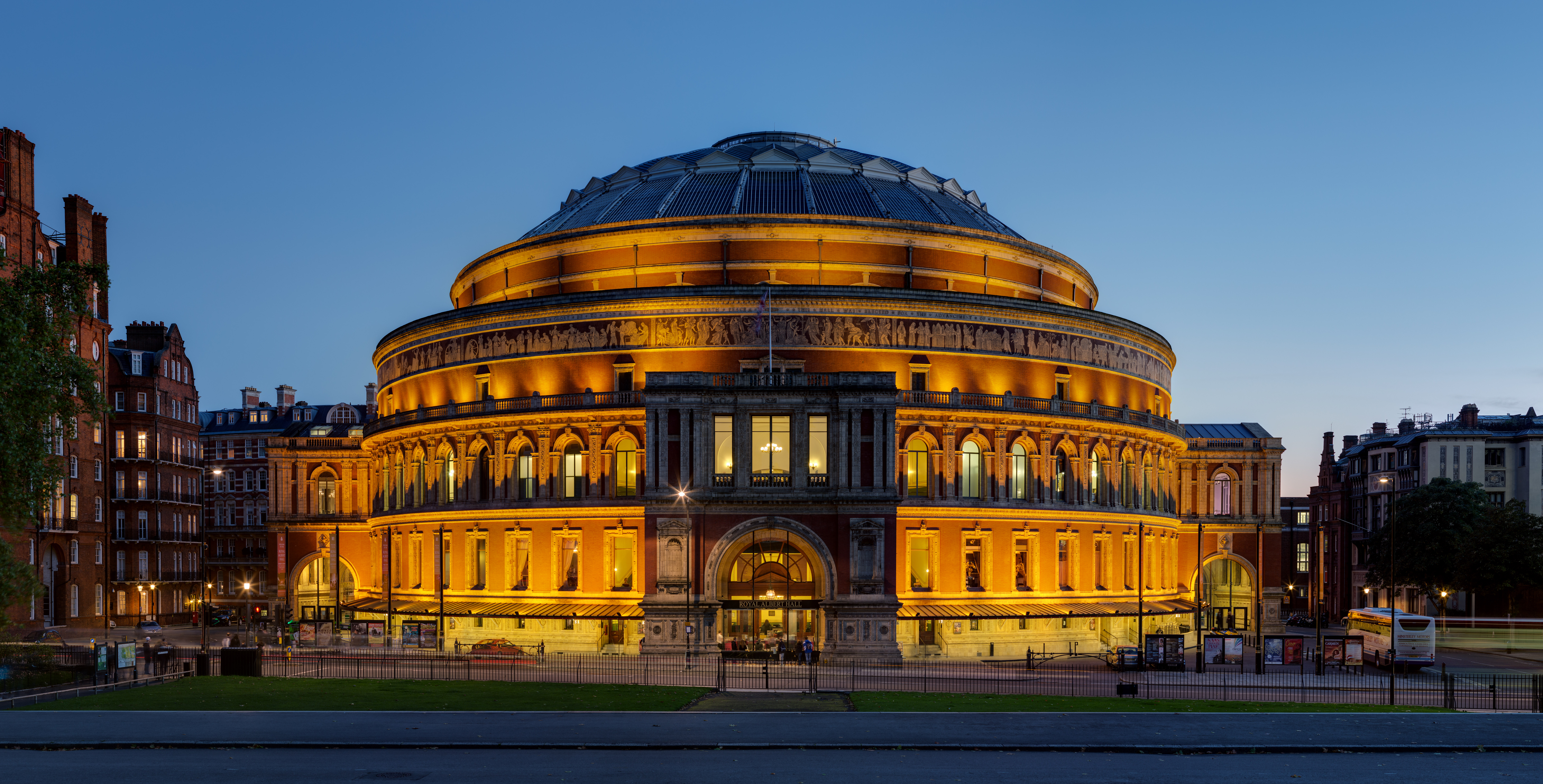
- Royal Albert Hall from Kensington Gardens

General information
- Type: Concert hall
- Architectural style: Italianate
- Location: Kensington Gore; London, SW7, United Kingdom
- Construction started: 1867^{1}
- Completed: 1871^{1}
- Inaugurated: 29 March 1871; 155 years ago
- Renovated: 1996–2004
- Cost: £200,000^{1}
- Client: Provisional Committee for the Central Hall of Arts and Sciences
- Owner: The Corporation of the Hall of Arts and Sciences

Height
- Height: 135 feet (41 m)

Design and construction
- Architects: Captain Francis Fowke and Major-General Henry Y. D. Scott
- Architecture firm: Royal Engineers
- Main contractor: Lucas Brothers

Other information
- Seating capacity: 5,272

Website
- royalalberthall.com

References
- ^{1} – Victorian London: Royal Albert Hall^{2} – Royal Albert Hall, London

The Royal Albert Hall is a concert hall on the northern edge of South Kensington, London, England. It has a seating capacity of 5,272.

Since the hall's opening by Queen Victoria in 1871, the world's leading artists from many performance genres have appeared on its stage. It is the venue for the BBC Proms concerts, which have been held there every summer since 1941. It is host to more than 390 shows in the main auditorium annually, including classical, rock and pop concerts, ballet, opera, film screenings with live orchestral accompaniment, sports, awards ceremonies, school and community events, and charity performances and banquets. A further 1,000 events are held each year in the non-auditorium spaces. Over its 155-year history, the hall has hosted events of a wide variety, including meetings held by suffragettes; speeches from Winston Churchill, Charles de Gaulle, and Albert Einstein; fights by Lennox Lewis; exhibition bouts by Muhammad Ali; and concerts from regular performers at the venue such as Eric Clapton and Shirley Bassey.

The hall was originally to have been called the Central Hall of Arts and Sciences, but the name was changed to the Royal Albert Hall of Arts and Sciences by Queen Victoria upon laying the hall's foundation stone in 1867, in memory of her husband, Prince Albert, who had died six years earlier. It forms the practical part of a memorial to the Prince Consort; the decorative part is the Albert Memorial directly to the north in Kensington Gardens, now separated from the hall by Kensington Gore.

== History ==
=== Nineteenth Century ===
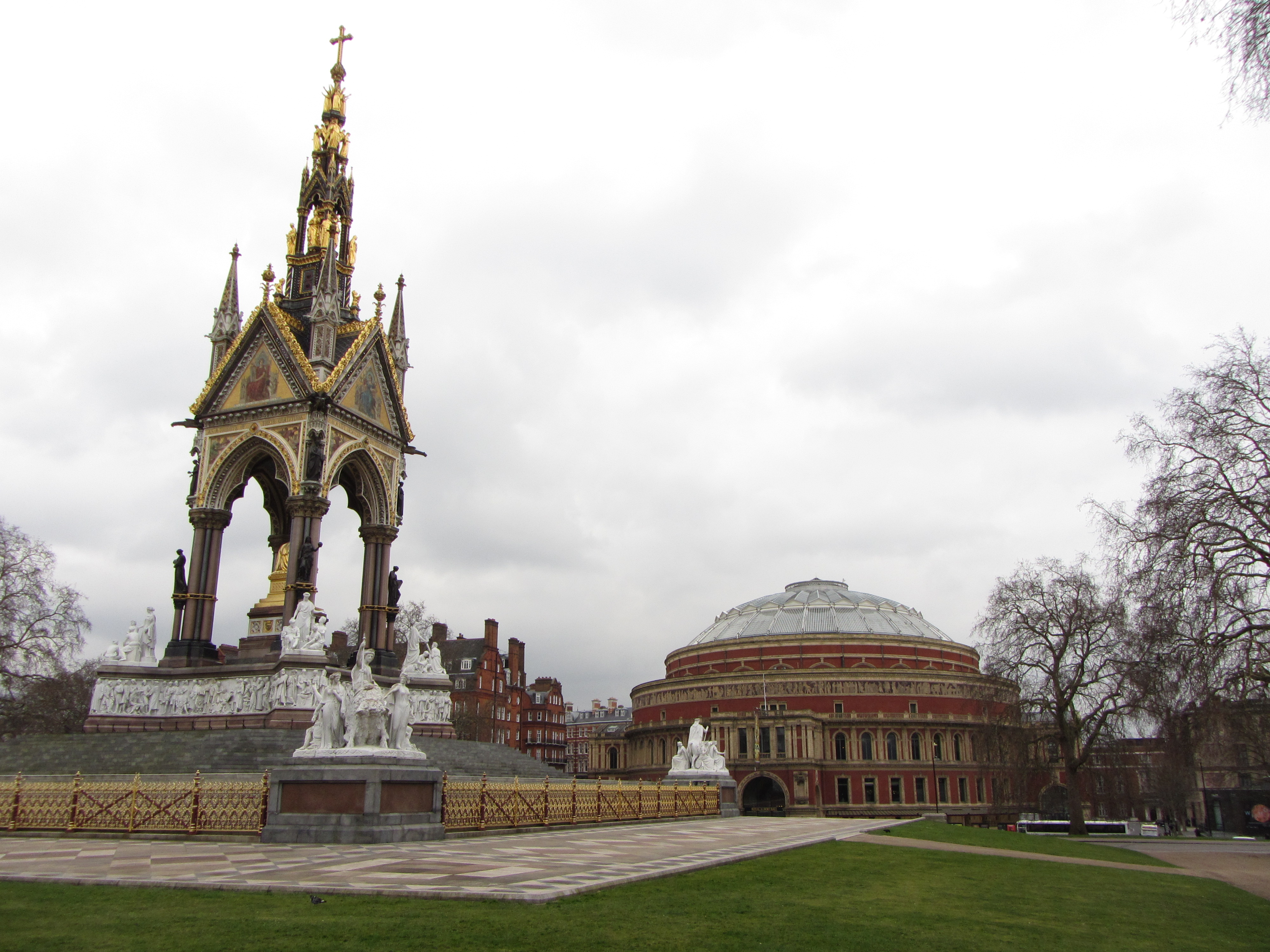
The Albert Memorial is located opposite the Royal Albert Hall, within the same area around Kensington Gardens.

In 1851, the Great Exhibition, organised by Prince Albert, the Prince Consort, was held in Hyde Park, London. The Exhibition was a success and led Prince Albert to propose the creation of a group of permanent facilities for the public benefit, which came to be known as Albertopolis. The Exhibition's Royal Commission bought Gore House, but it was slow to act, and in 1861 Prince Albert died without having seen his ideas come to fruition. However, a memorial was proposed for Hyde Park, with a Great Hall opposite.

The proposal was approved, and the site was purchased with some of the profits from the Exhibition. The hall was designed by civil engineers Captain Francis Fowke and Major-General Henry Y. D. Scott of the Royal Engineers and built by Lucas Brothers. The designers were heavily influenced by ancient amphitheatres but had also been exposed to the ideas of Gottfried Semper while he was working at the South Kensington Museum. The recently opened Cirque d'Hiver in Paris was seen in the contemporary press as the design to outdo. The hall was constructed mainly of Fareham Red brick, with terra cotta block decoration made by Gibbs and Canning of Tamworth.

The dome (designed by Rowland Mason Ordish) was made of wrought iron and glazed. There was a trial assembly of the dome's iron framework in Manchester; then it was taken apart again and transported to London by horse and cart. When the time came for the supporting structure to be removed from the dome after reassembly in situ, only volunteers remained on site in case the structure collapsed. It did drop – but only by five-sixteenths of an inch (7.9 mm). The hall was scheduled to be completed by Christmas Day 1870, and the Queen visited a few weeks beforehand to inspect.

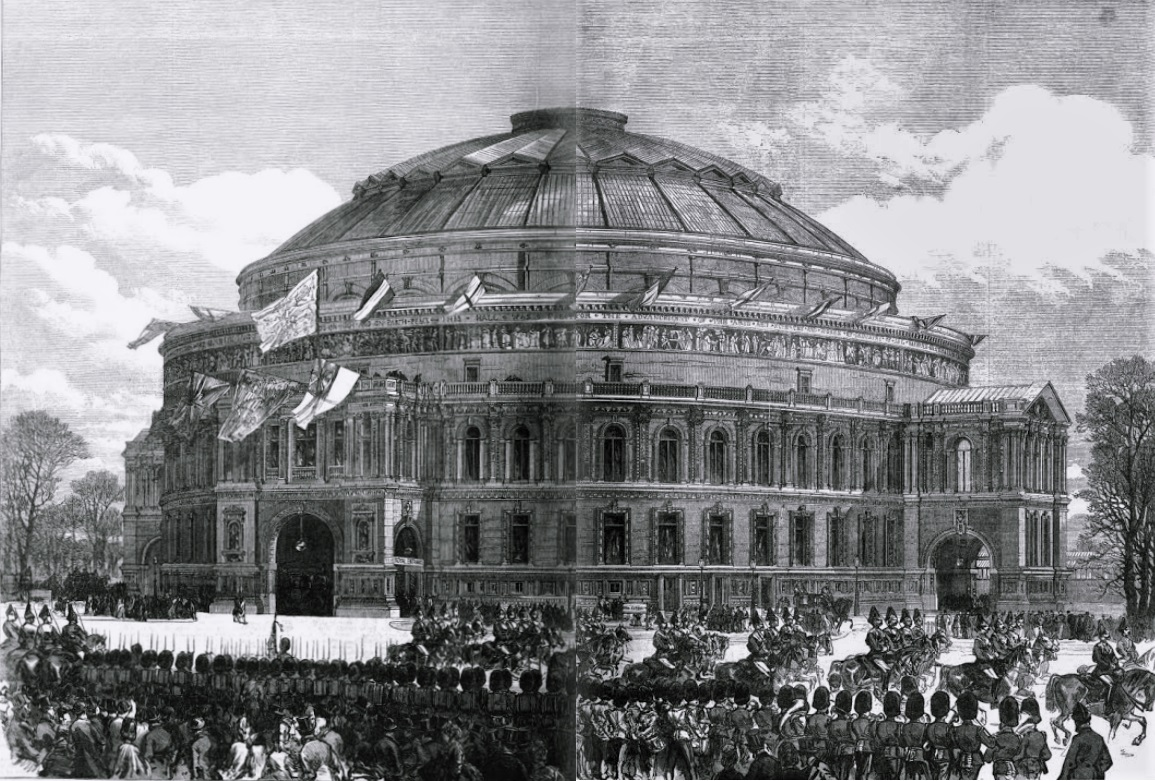
The Royal Albert Hall in London was officially opened on 29 March 1871 by Queen Victoria and her eldest son, the Prince of Wales, in honor of her late husband, Prince Albert.

The official opening ceremony of the hall was on 29 March 1871. This had originally been scheduled for 1 May, the twentieth anniversary of the opening of the Great Exhibition, but was brought forward at the request of Queen Victoria. A welcoming speech was given by Edward, the Prince of Wales because the Queen was too overcome to speak; "her only recorded comment on the Hall was that it reminded her of the British constitution".

The composer, organist, and choir conductor William Carter founded and directed a choir specifically for the opening of the Royal Albert Hall. In the concert that followed, the hall's acoustic problems immediately became apparent. Engineers first tried to remove the strong echo by suspending a canvas awning below the dome. This helped and also sheltered concert-goers from the sun, but the problem was not solved: it used to be jokingly said the hall was "the only place where a British composer could be sure of hearing his work twice".

In July 1871, French organist Camille Saint-Saëns performed Church Scene from Faust by Charles Gounod; The Orchestra described his performance as "an exceptional and distinguished performer ... the effect was most marvellous."

Initially lit by gas, the hall contained a special system by which thousands of gas jets were lit within ten seconds. Though it was demonstrated as early as 1873 in the hall, full electric lighting was not installed until 1888. During an early trial when a partial installation was made, one disgruntled patron wrote to The Times, declaring it to be "a very ghastly and unpleasant innovation".

In May 1877, Richard Wagner himself conducted the first half of each of the eight concerts which made up the Grand Wagner Festival. After his turn with the baton, he handed it over to conductor Hans Richter and sat in a large armchair on the corner of the stage for the rest of each concert. Wagner's wife Cosima, the daughter of Hungarian virtuoso pianist and composer Franz Liszt, was among the audience.

The Wine Society was founded at the hall on 4 August 1874, after large quantities of cask wine were found in the cellars. A series of lunches were held to publicise the wines, and General Henry Scott proposed a co-operative company to buy and sell wines.

=== Twentieth Century ===
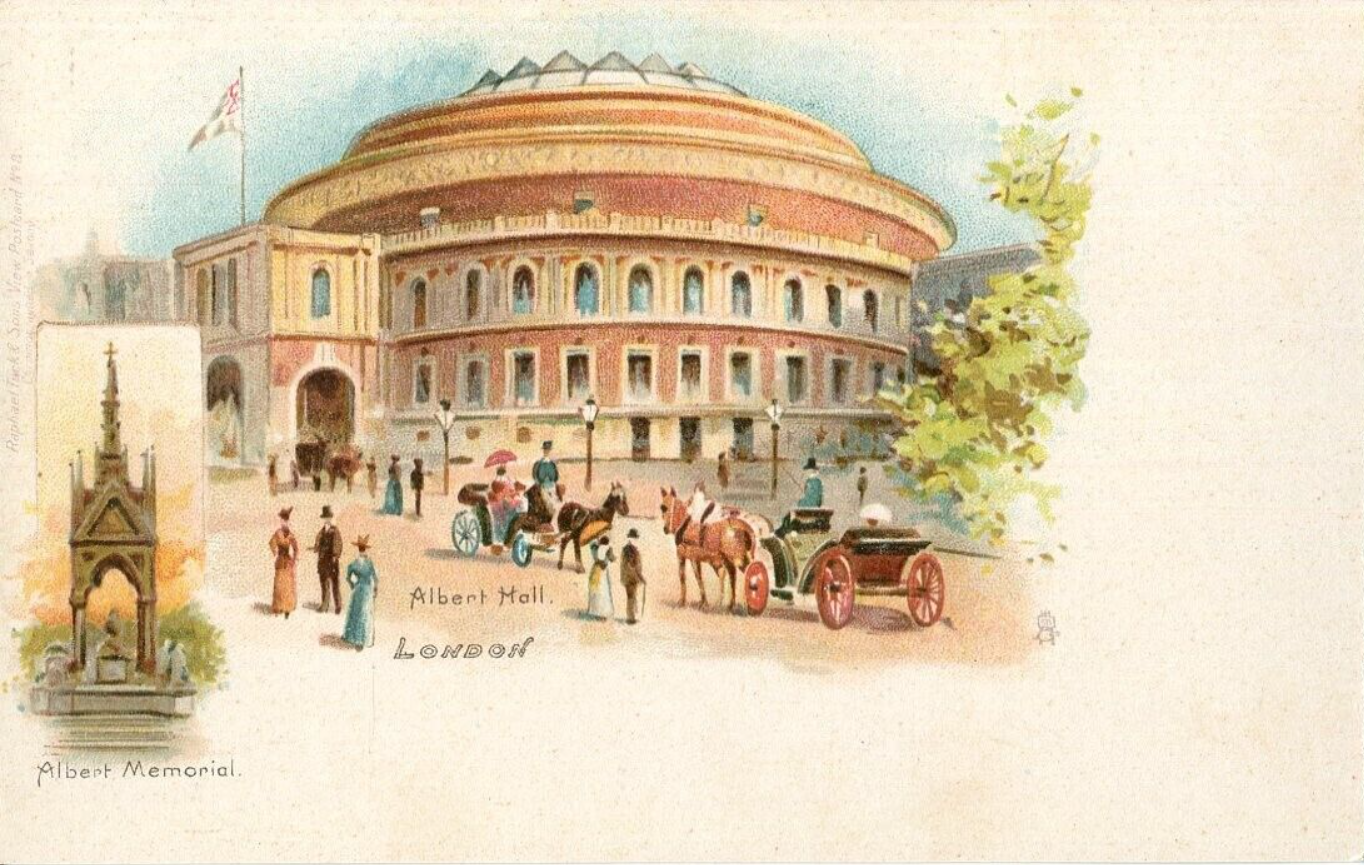
Postcard of the Royal Albert Hall (c. 1903) with an inset of the Albert Memorial

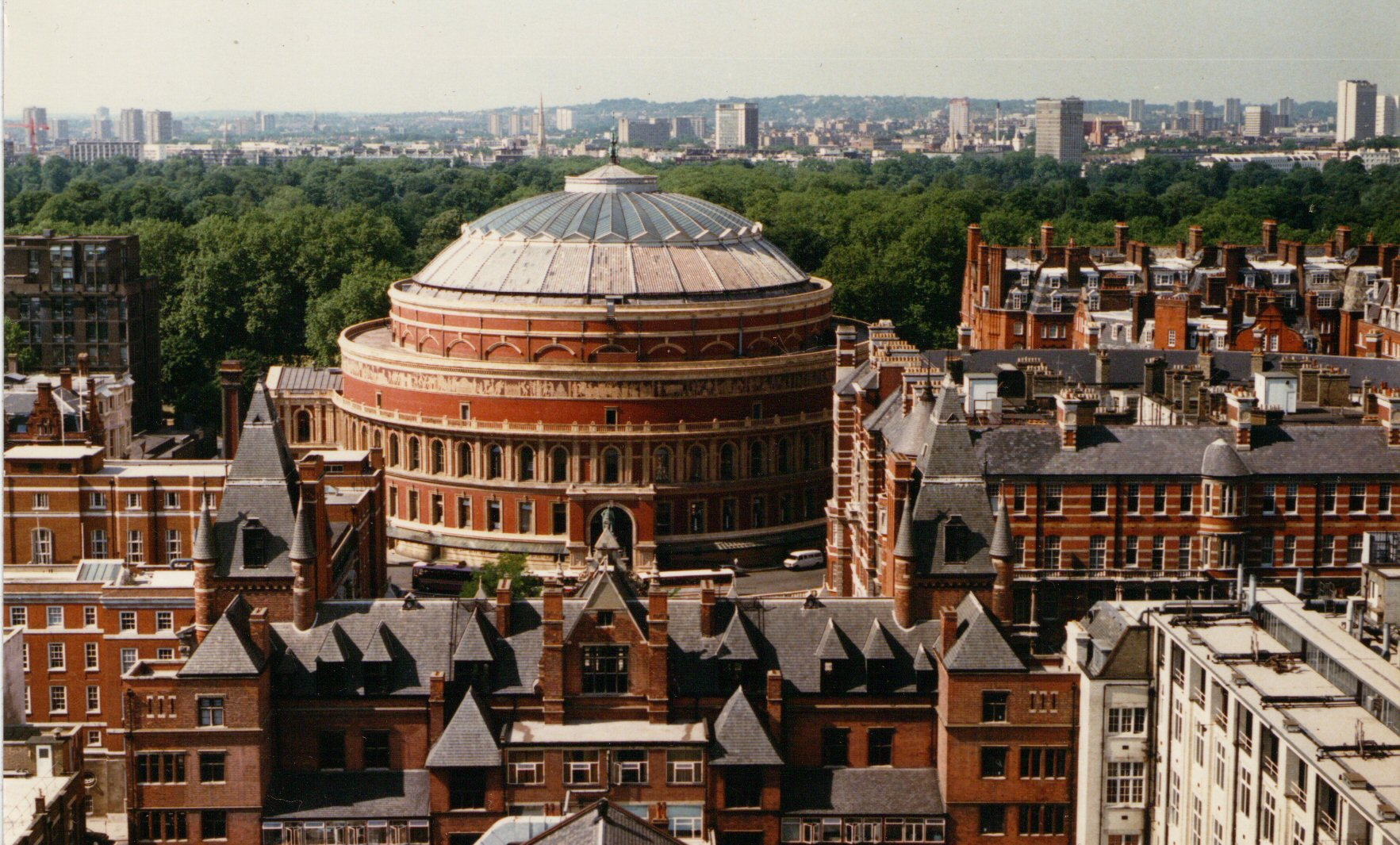
Royal Albert Hall, viewed from the south looking north towards Hyde Park, 1986.

In 1906, Elsie Fogerty founded the Central School of Speech and Drama at the hall, using its West Theatre, now the Elgar Room, as the school's theatre. The school moved to Swiss Cottage in north London in 1957. Whilst the school was based at the Royal Albert Hall, students who graduated from its classes included Judi Dench, Vanessa Redgrave, Lynn Redgrave, Harold Pinter, Laurence Olivier and Peggy Ashcroft.

In 1911, Russian pianist and composer Sergei Rachmaninoff performed as a part of the London Ballad Concert. The recital included his 'Prelude in C♯ minor' and 'Elegie in E♭ minor' (both from Morceaux de Fantaisie).

In 1926, British media proprietor but then dancer Lew Grade won the 'Charleston Championship of the World', where American actor and dancer Fred Astaire was one of the judges.

In 1933, German physicist Albert Einstein led the 'Einstein Meeting' at the hall for the Council for Assisting Refugee Academics, a British charity.

In 1936, the hall was the scene of a giant rally celebrating the British Empire on the occasion of the centenary of Joseph Chamberlain's birth. In October 1942, the hall suffered minor damage during World War II bombing, but in general was left mostly untouched as German pilots used the distinctive structure as a landmark.

In 1949, the canvas awning was removed and replaced with fluted aluminium panels below the glass roof, in a new attempt to cure the echo; but the acoustics were not properly tackled until 1969 when large fibreglass acoustic diffusing discs (commonly referred to as "mushrooms" or "flying saucers") were installed below the ceiling. In 1968, the hall hosted the Eurovision Song Contest 1968 which was broadcast on television live in colour for the first time, and from 1969 to 1988 the Miss World contest was staged in the venue.

From 1996 until 2004, the hall underwent a programme of renovation and development supported by a £20 million grant from the Heritage Lottery Fund and £20m from Arts Council England to enable it to meet the demands of the next century of events and performances. Thirty "discreet projects" were designed and supervised by the architecture and engineering firm BDP without disrupting events. These projects included improved ventilation to the auditorium, more bars and restaurants, improved seating, better technical facilities, and improved backstage areas. Internally, the Circle seating was rebuilt during June 1996 to provide more legroom, better access, and improved sightlines.

=== 2000 - 2009 ===
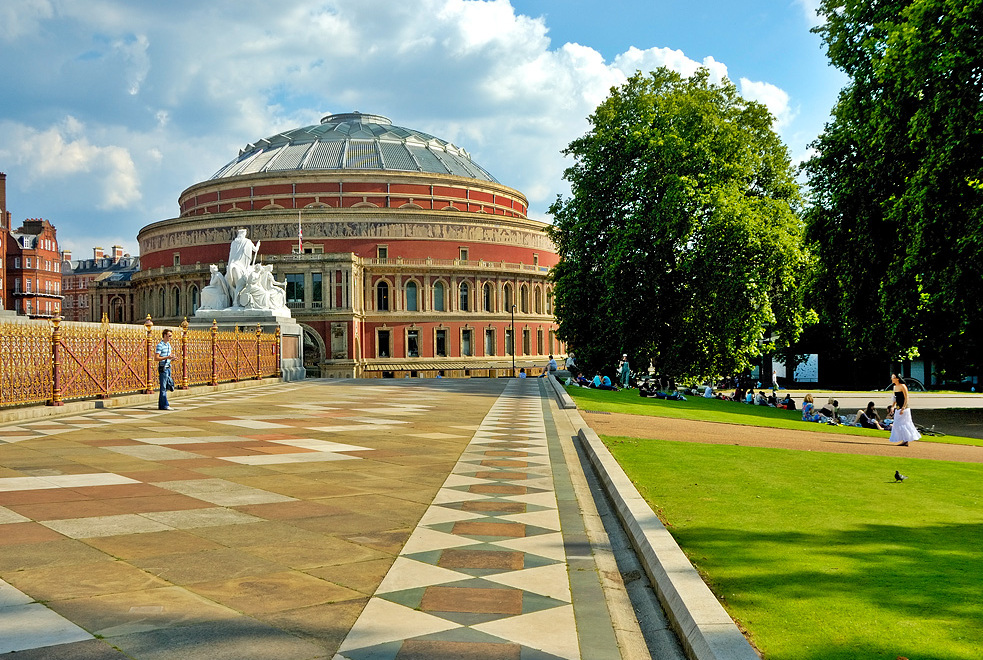
The hall with Kensington Gardens to the right

The largest project of the ongoing renovation and development was the building of a new south porch – door 12, accommodating a first-floor restaurant, new ground floor box office and subterranean loading bay. Although the exterior of the building was largely unchanged, the south steps leading down to Prince Consort Road were demolished to allow construction of underground vehicle access and a loading bay with accommodation for three HGVs carrying all the equipment brought by shows. The steps were then reconstructed around a new south porch, named The Meitar Foyer after a significant donation from Mr & Mrs Meitar. The porch was built on a similar scale and style to the three pre-existing porches at Door 3, 6 and 9: these works were undertaken by Taylor Woodrow Construction. On 4 June 2004, the project received the Europa Nostra Award for remarkable achievement.

The East (Door 3) and West (Door 9) porches were glazed and new bars opened along with ramps to improve disabled access. The Stalls were rebuilt in a four-week period in 2000 using steel supports allowing more space underneath for two new bars; 1,534 unique pivoting seats were laid – with an addition of 180 prime seats. The Choirs were rebuilt at the same time. The whole building was redecorated in a style that reinforces its Victorian identity. 43,000 sq ft (4,000 m^{2}) of new carpets were laid in the rooms, stairs, and corridors – specially woven with a border that follows the oval curve of the building.

Between 2002 and 2004, there was a major rebuilding of the great organ (known as the Voice of Jupiter), built by "Father" Henry Willis in 1871 and rebuilt by Harrison & Harrison in 1924 and 1933. The rebuilding was performed by Mander Organs, and it is now the second-largest pipe organ in the British Isles with 9,997 pipes in 147 stops and able produce 95 to 100 decibels in volume. The largest is the Grand Organ in Liverpool Cathedral which has 10,268 pipes.

=== 2010 - 2019 ===
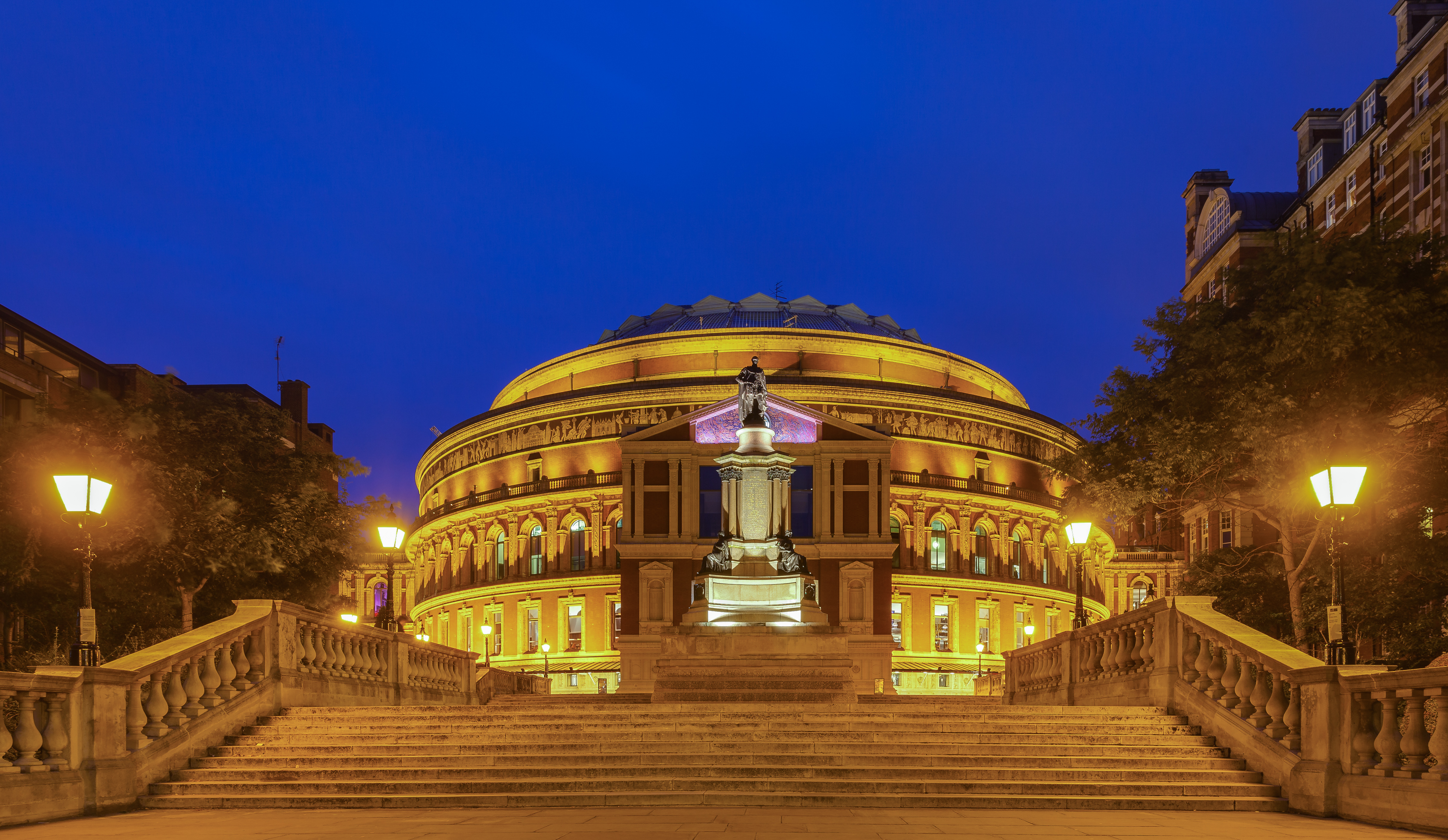
The Royal Albert Hall as seen from Prince Consort Road

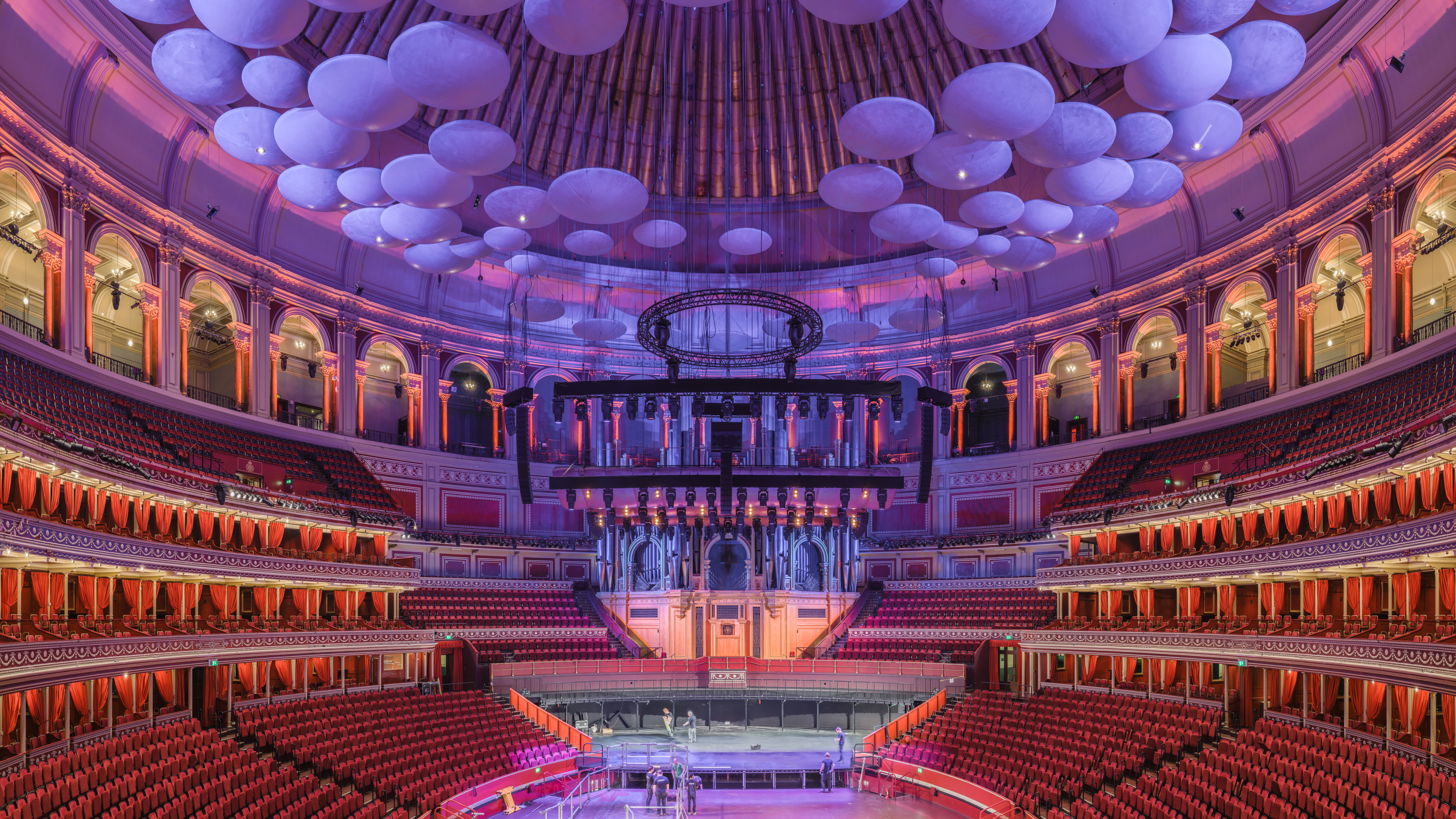
Acoustic diffusing discs (lit in purple/blue) hanging from the roof of the hall. The fluted aluminium panels are seen behind.

During the first half of 2011, changes were made to the backstage areas to relocate and increase the size of crew catering areas under the South Steps away from the stage and create additional dressing rooms nearer to the stage.

From January to May 2013, the Box Office area at Door 12 underwent further modernisation to include a new Café Bar on the ground floor, a new Box Office with shop counters and additional toilets. The design and construction were carried out by contractor 8Build. Upon opening it was renamed 'The Zvi and Ofra Meitar Porch and Foyer.' owing to a large donation from the couple.

In Autumn 2013, work began on replacing the Victorian steam heating system over three years and improving cooling across the building. This work followed the summer Proms season during which temperatures were unusually high. Further heatwaves led to a rebuild of the Rausing Circle level in 2021 with air-cooling ventilation installed, significantly decreasing heat there during hot weather.

In 2017, work began on a two-story 11,000-square-foot (1,000 m^{2}) basement extension for use as backstage and archival space to the south-west quadrant of the building. The project is nicknamed the "Great Excavation", in reference to the Great Exhibition of 1851. A new archive space opened in the extension on 12 October 2023.

In 2018, a Walk of Fame was unveiled at the hall, with the first eleven recipients of a star including the Suffragettes (who held meetings at the hall), Winston Churchill and Albert Einstein (both of whom delivered speeches here), Muhammad Ali (who had exhibition events at a venue he dubbed a 'helluva hall'), and Eric Clapton (who has played the venue over 200 times), among others, who were viewed as "key players" in the building's history.

=== 2020 - present ===
Due to the COVID-19 pandemic, restrictions meant the hall was closed on 17 March 2020 for the longest time since the Second World War. In December 2020, it reopened for three socially distanced performances but was then closed for a second period, finally reopening to full capacity on 19 July 2021.

On 11 November 2023, before the Festival of Remembrance, King Charles III and Queen Camilla unveiled two bronze statues of Queen Elizabeth II and Prince Philip, Duke of Edinburgh, as part of the hall's 150th anniversary.

== Design ==
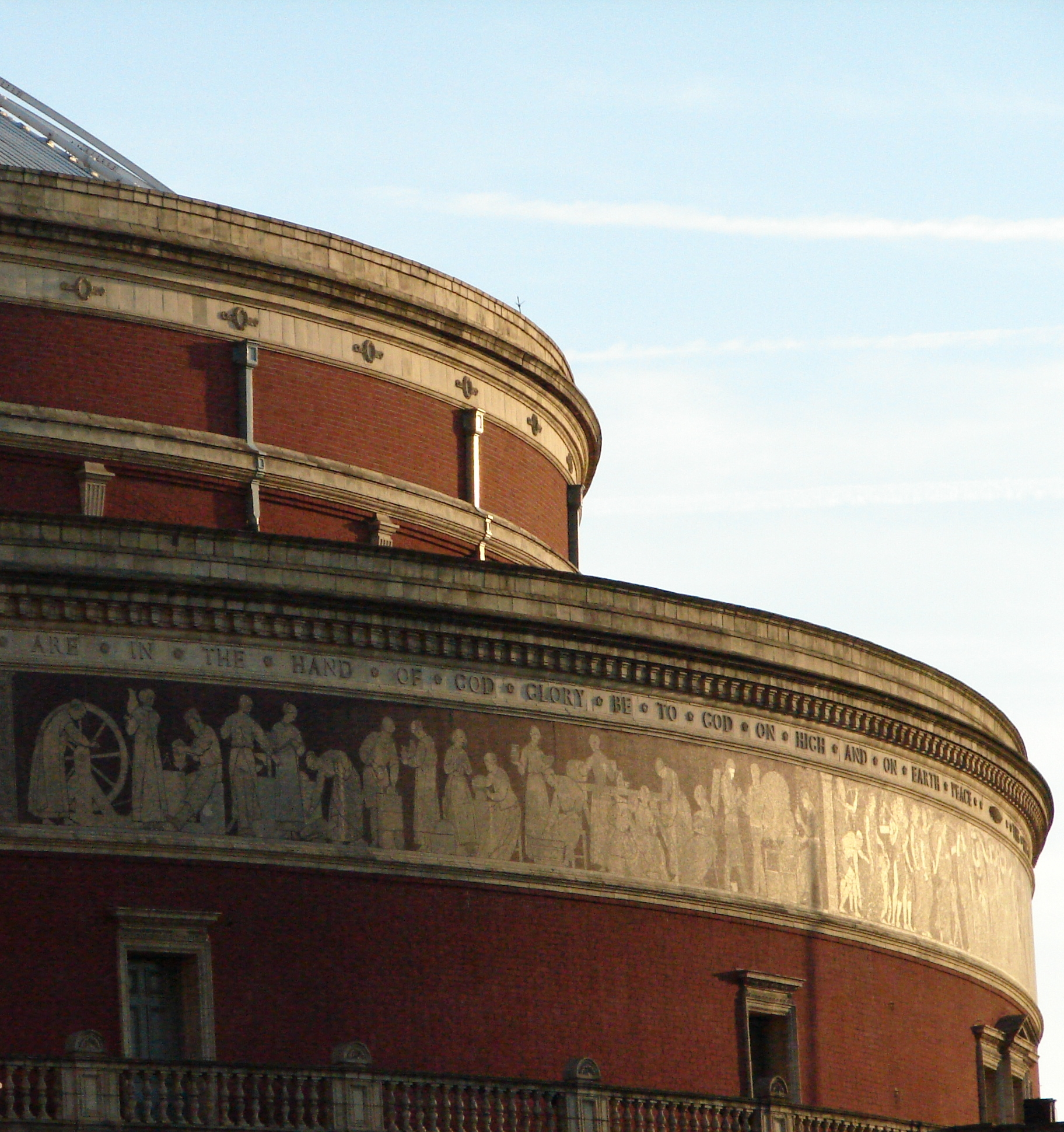
The Triumph of Arts and Sciences

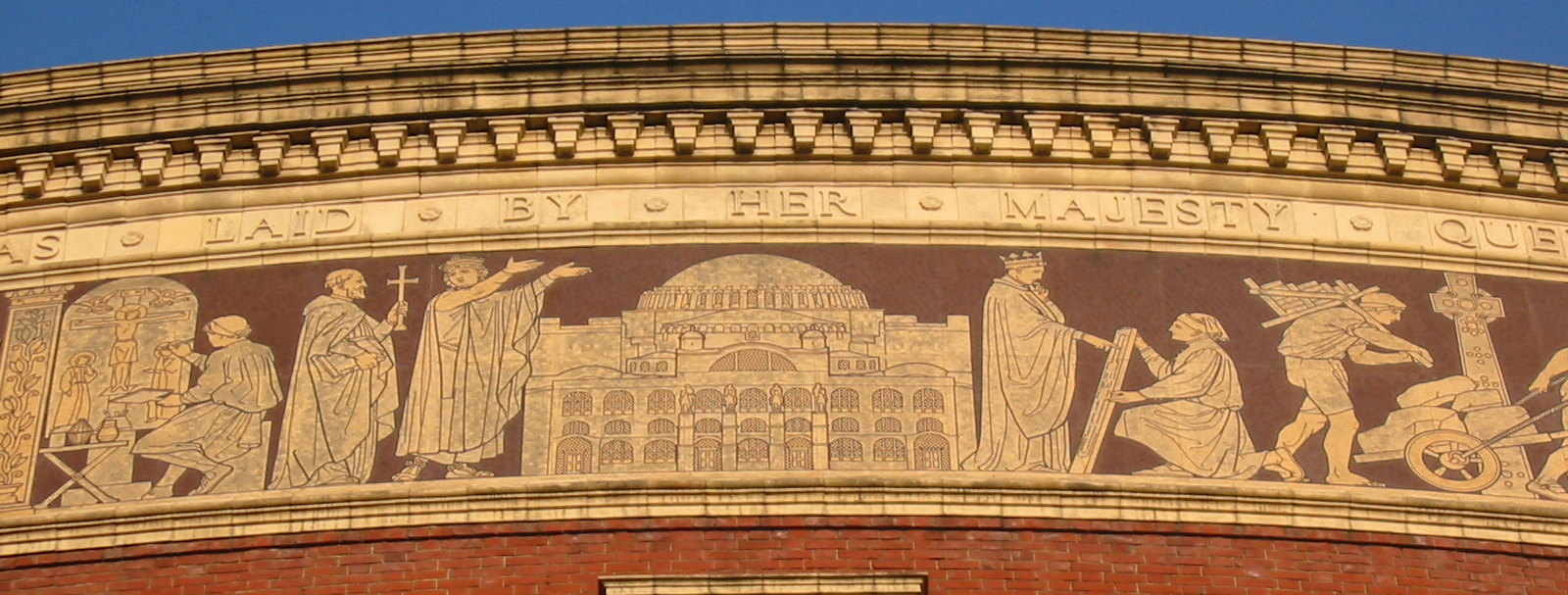
Frieze on the Royal Albert Hall

The hall, a Grade I listed building, is an ellipse in plan, with its external major and minor axes of 272 and 236 feet (83 and 72 meters), and its internal minor and major axis of 185 and 219 feet (56 and 67 m). The great glass and wrought-iron dome roofing the hall is 135 ft (41 m) high. The hall was originally designed with a capacity for 8,000 people and has accommodated as many as 12,000 (although present-day safety restrictions mean the maximum permitted capacity is now 5,272 including standing in the Gallery).

Around the outside of the building is 800-foot–long terracotta mosaic frieze, depicting "The Triumph of Arts and Sciences", in reference to the hall's dedication. Proceeding counter-clockwise from the north side the sixteen subjects of the frieze are:

1. Various Countries of the World bringing in their Offerings to the Exhibition of 1851
2. Music
3. Sculpture
4. Painting
5. Princes, Art Patrons and Artists
6. Workers in Stone
7. Workers in Wood and Brick
8. Architecture
9. The Infancy of the Arts and Sciences
10. Agriculture
11. Horticulture and Land Surveying
12. Astronomy and Navigation
13. A Group of Philosophers, Sages and Students
14. Engineering
15. The Mechanical Powers
16. Pottery and Glassmaking

Above the frieze is an inscription in 12-inch-high (30 cm) terracotta letters that combine historical fact and Biblical quotations:

This hall was erected for the advancement of the arts and sciences and works of industry of all nations in fulfilment of the intention of Albert Prince Consort. The site was purchased with the proceeds of the Great Exhibition of the year MDCCCLI. The first stone of the Hall was laid by Her Majesty Queen Victoria on the twentieth day of May MDCCCLXVII and it was opened by Her Majesty the Twenty Ninth of March in the year MDCCCLXXI. Thine O Lord is the greatness and the power and the glory and the victory and the majesty. For all that is in the heaven and in the earth is Thine. The wise and their works are in the hand of God. Glory be to God on high and on earth peace.

Below the Arena floor there is room for two 4,000 gallon water tanks, which are used for shows that flood the arena like Madame Butterfly.

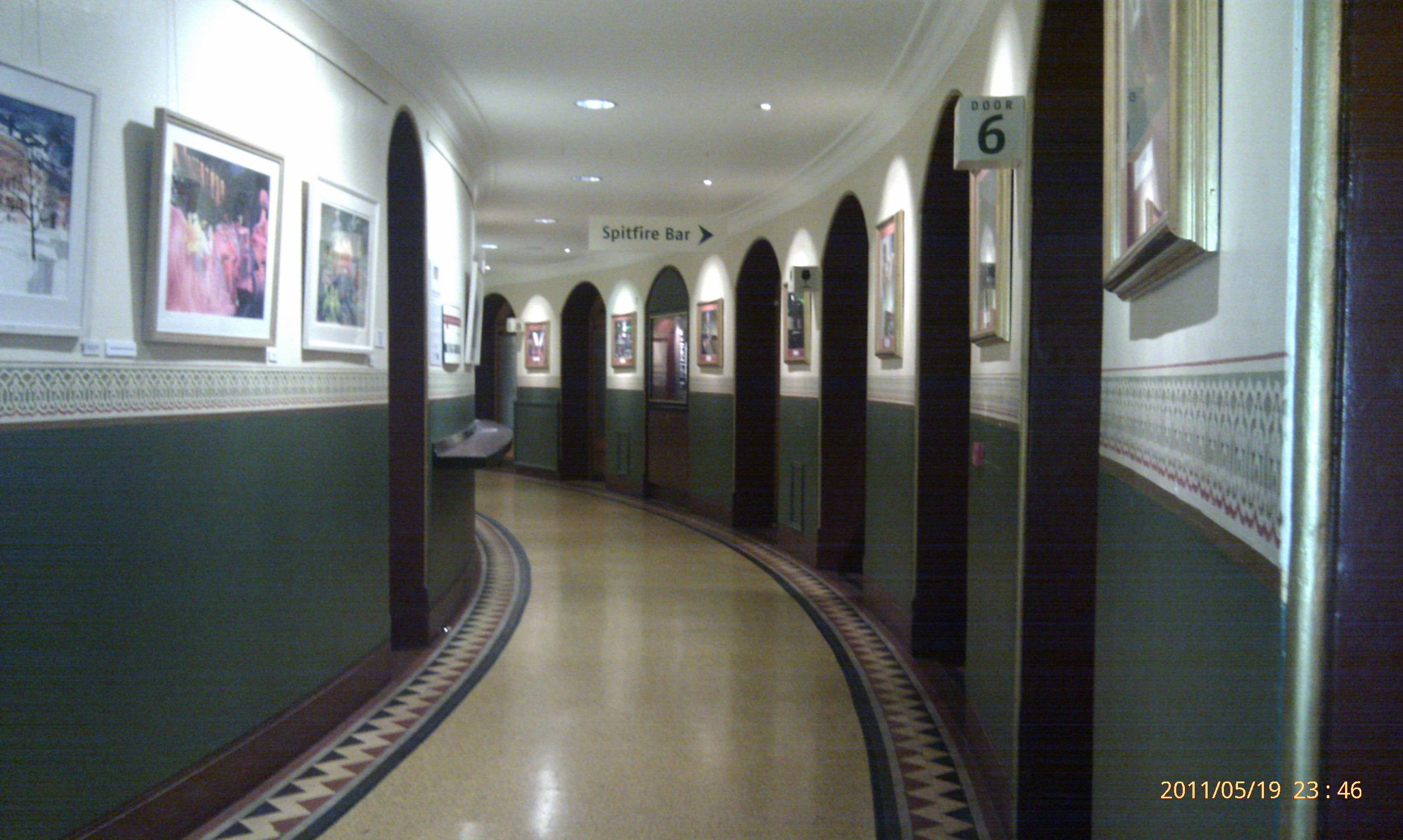
Amphi corridor on the ground floor, facing West from Door 6

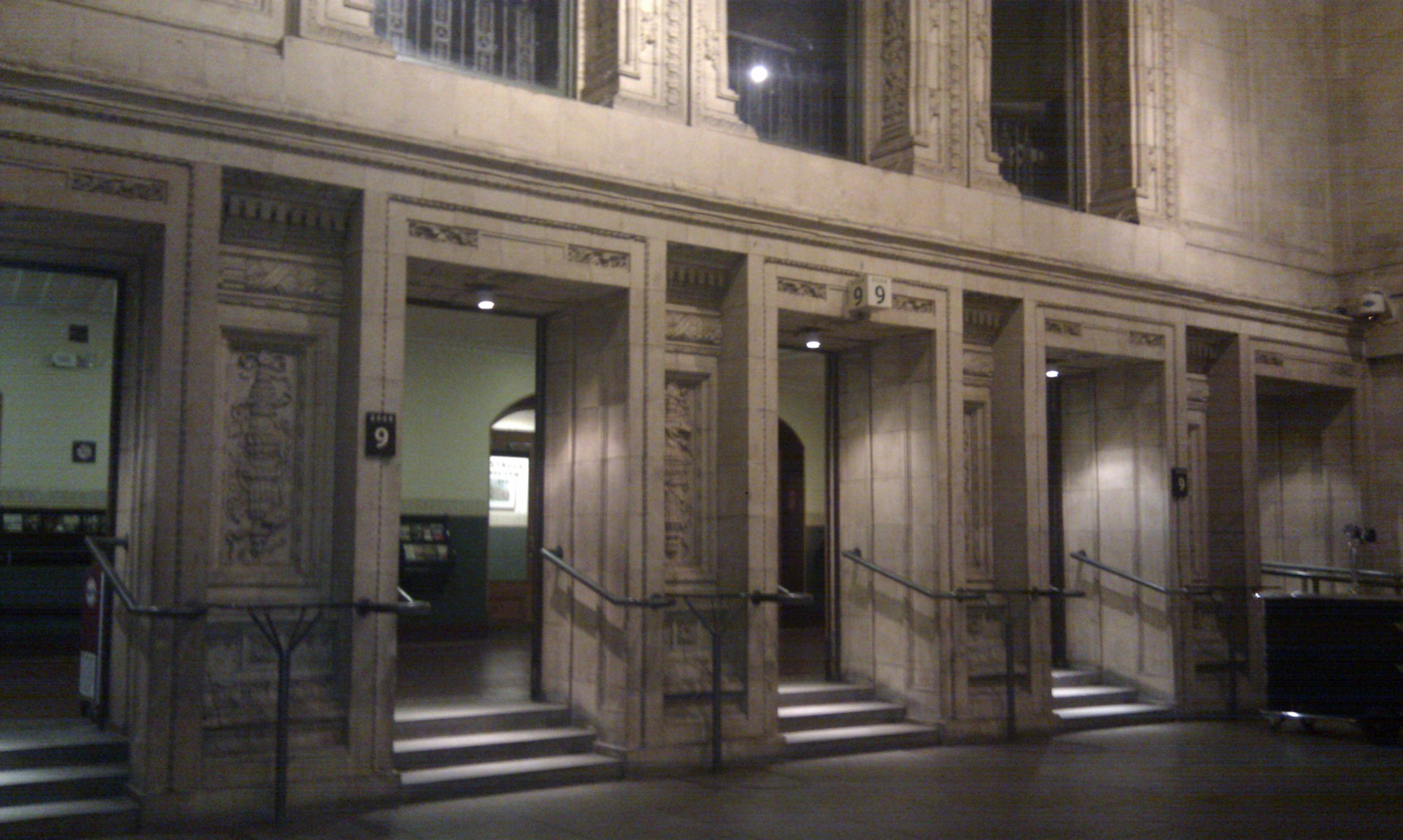
The Door 9 porch at night

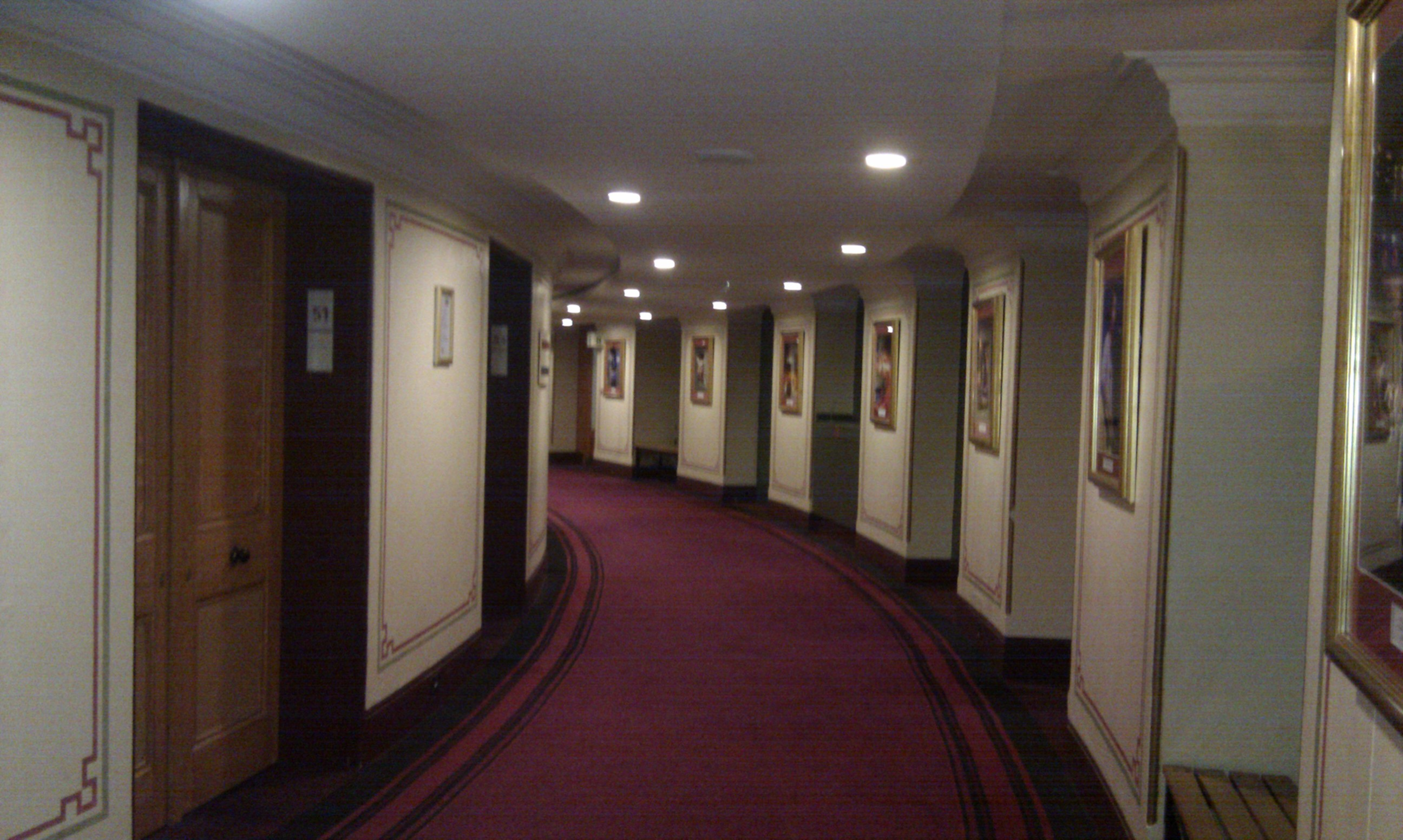
Second Tier corridor, facing West from Door 6

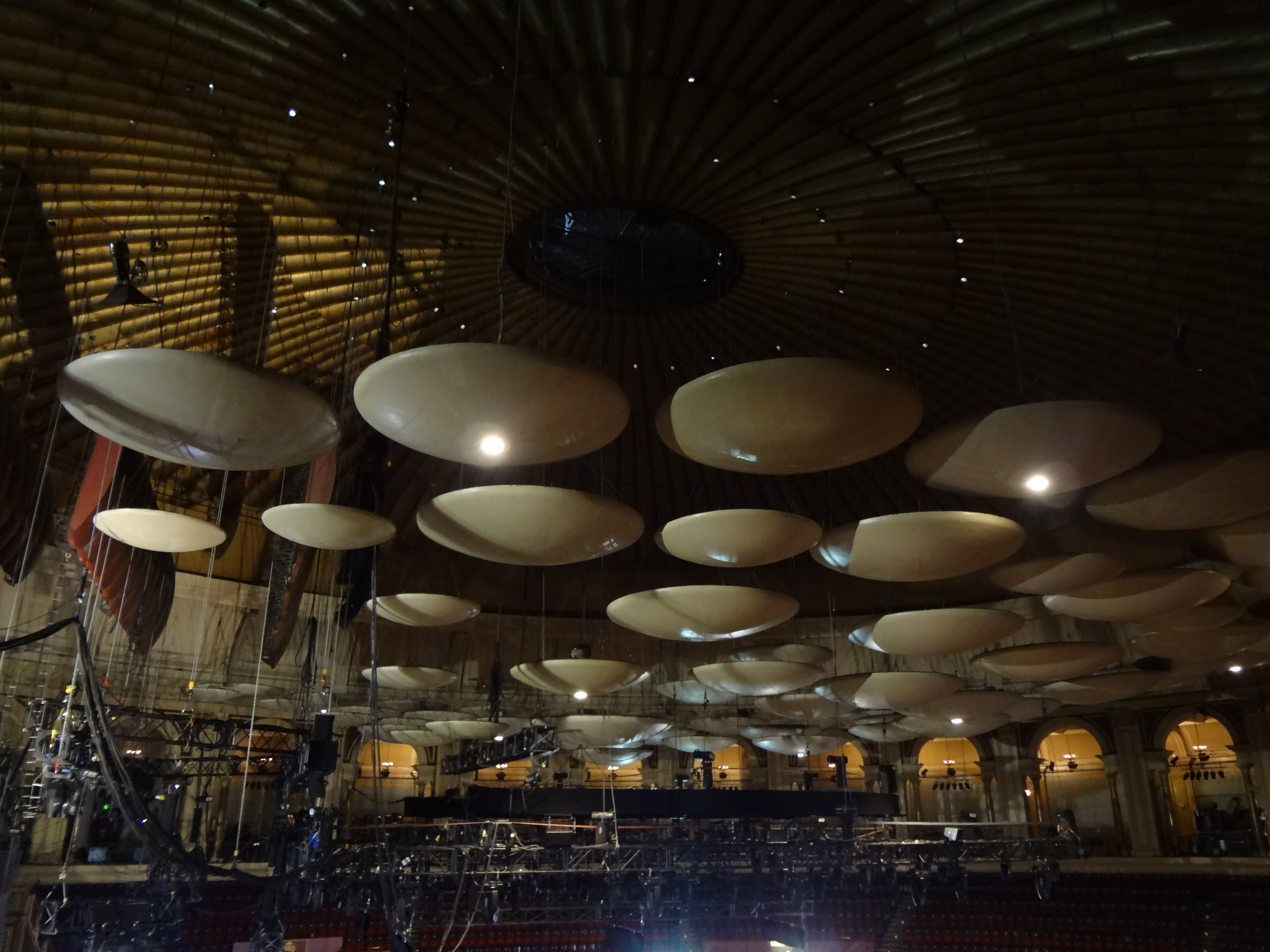
Fluted aluminium roof and diffuser discs seen from the Gallery

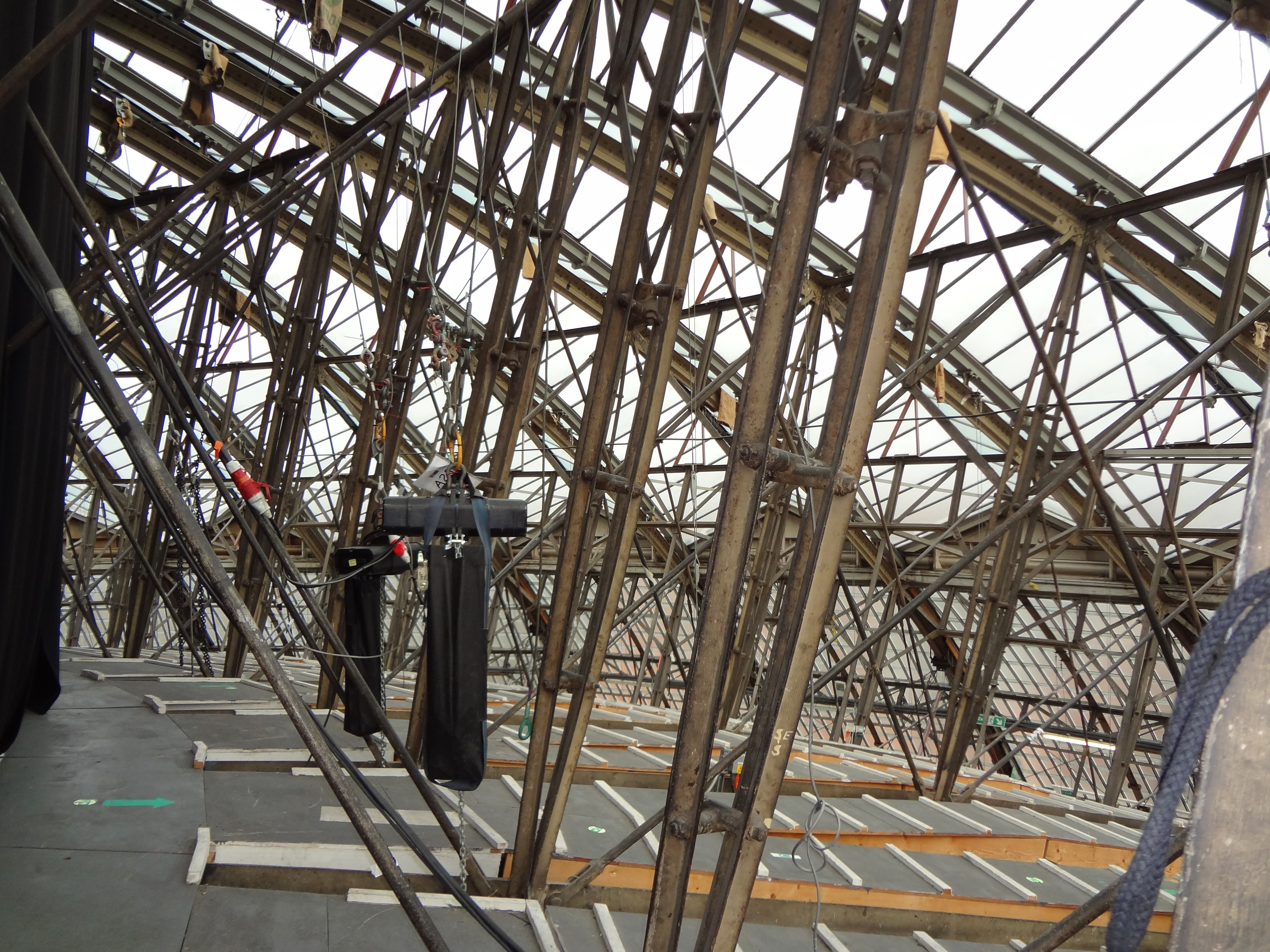
The glazed roof and vertical struts supporting the fluted aluminium ceiling, beneath the wooden floor

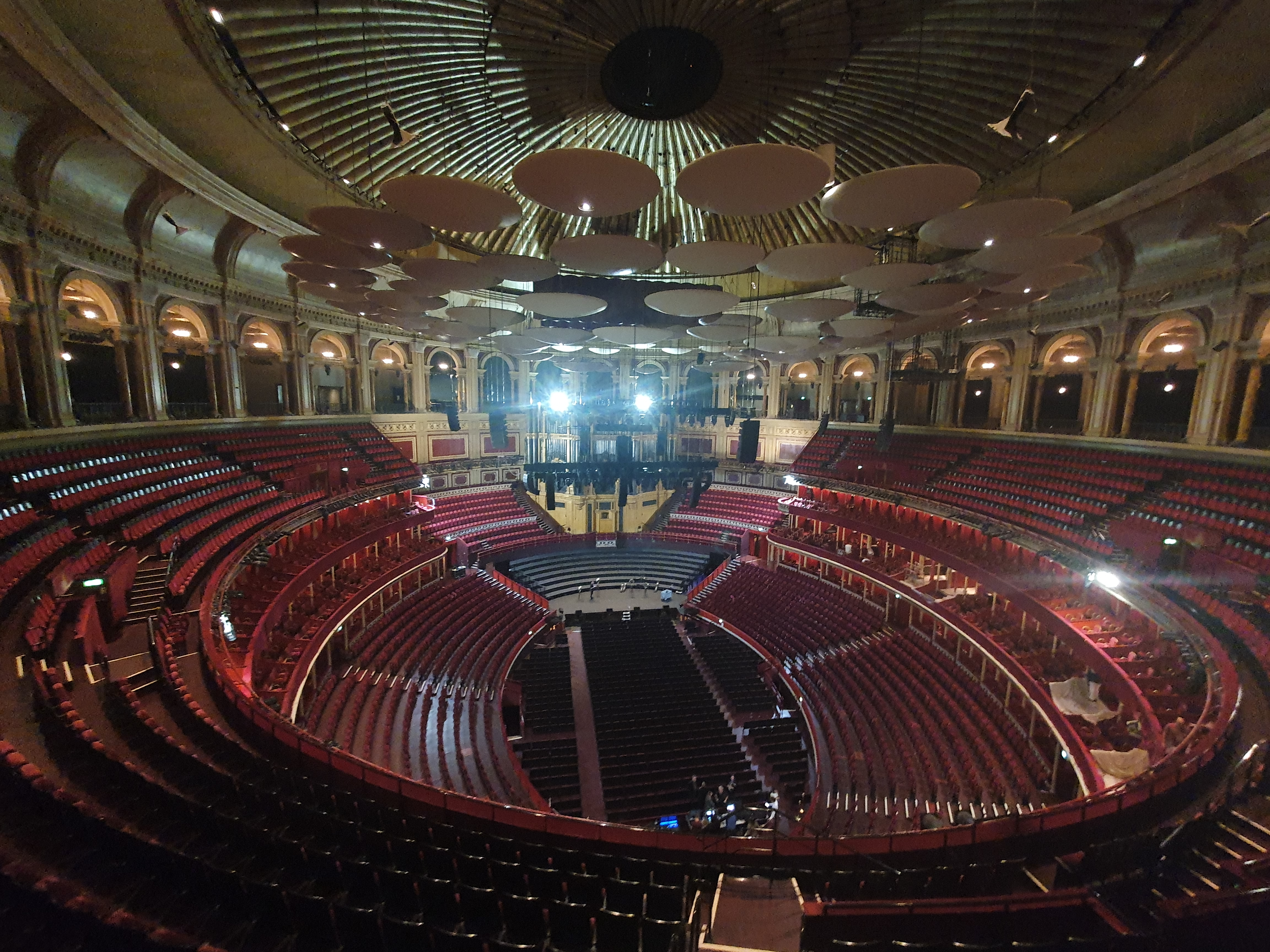
Interior of the Royal Albert Hall, showing the stage, seating tiers, and acoustic diffusers beneath the dome.

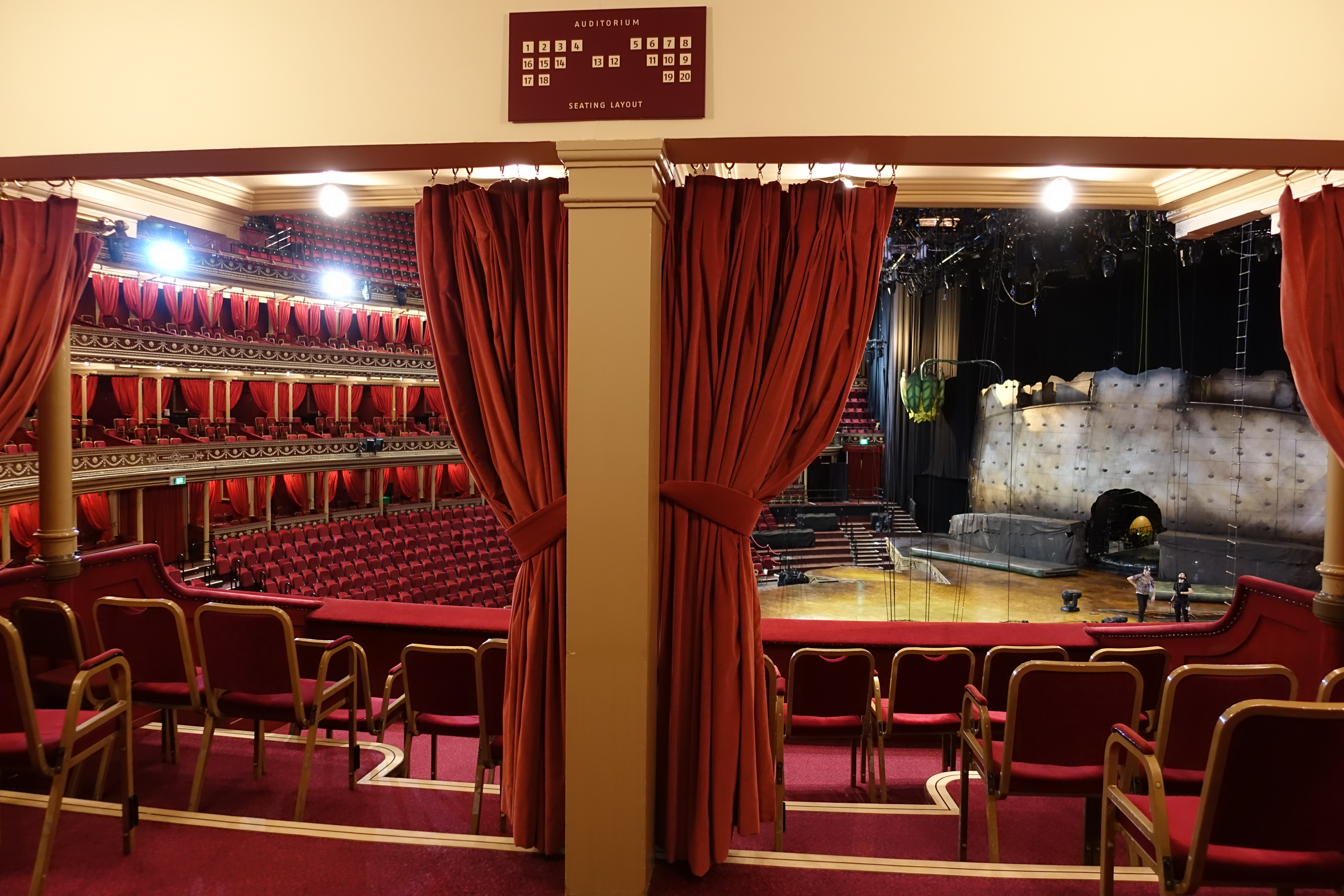
View from the Royal Box, looking towards the stage

== Events ==
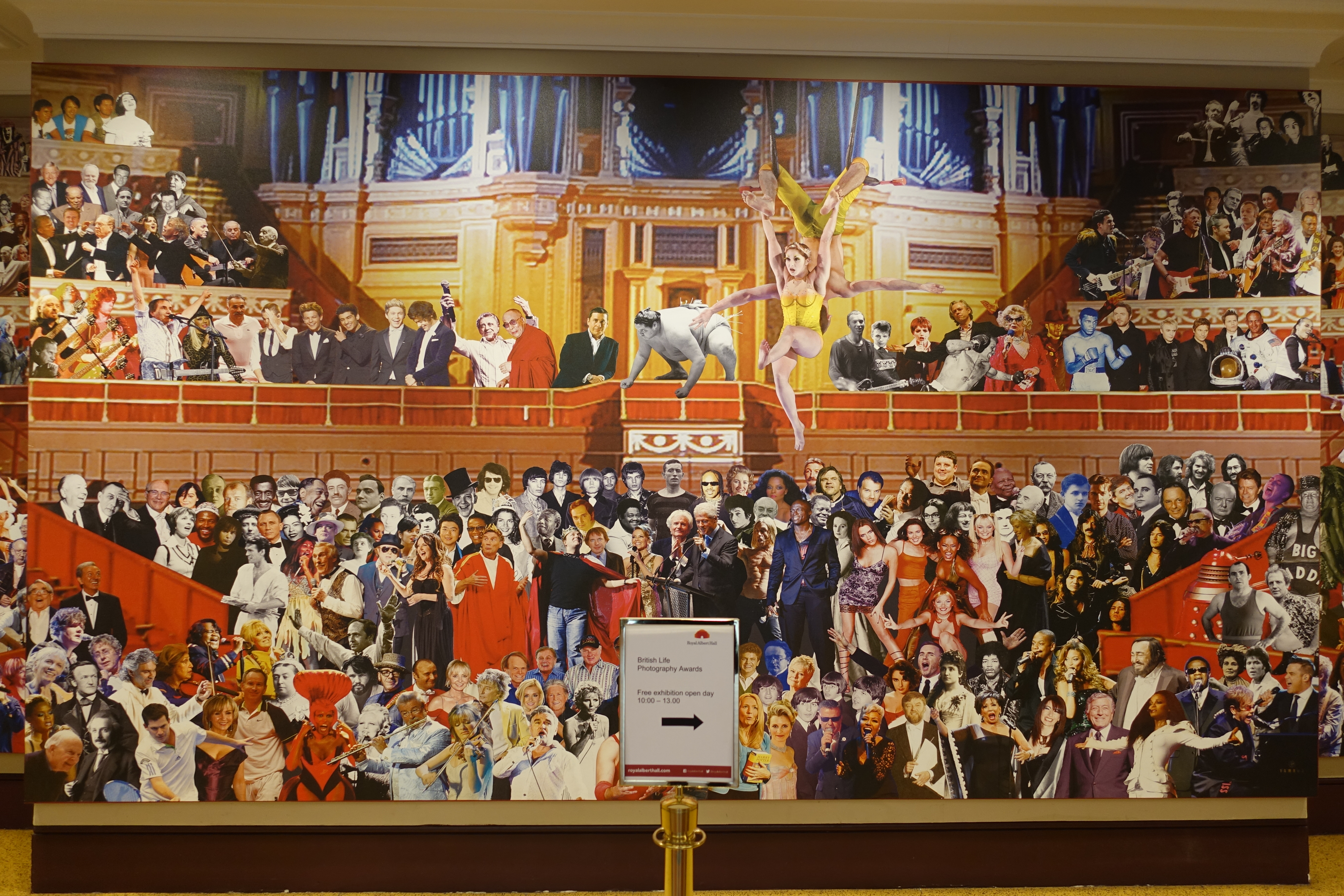
Appearing at the Royal Albert Hall (2014) is a specially commissioned mural by Sir Peter Blake. The work serves as a visual "who's who" of more than 140 years of culture at the venue, featuring over 400 notable figures who have appeared on its stage since 1871. Alongside musicians such as Bob Dylan, David Bowie, Jimi Hendrix, Adele, Beyoncé and Jay-Z, the mural also includes historical and cultural icons such as Albert Einstein, Sir Winston Churchill, Muhammad Ali, astronaut Buzz Aldrin, and even the fictional Dalek and wrestling legend Big Daddy.

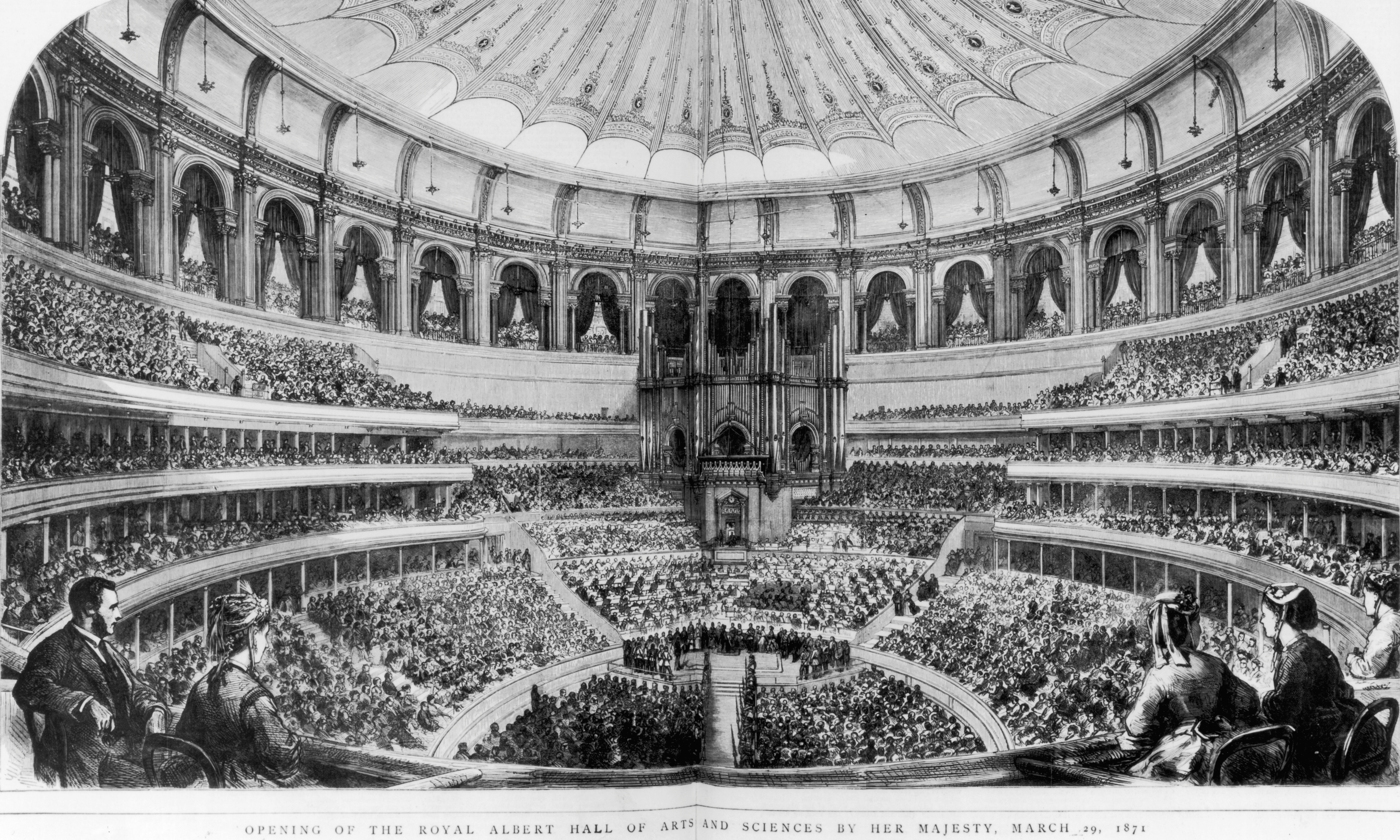
The Royal Albert Hall of Arts and Sciences was opened by Her Majesty on 29 March 1871.

The hall has been affectionately titled "The Nation's Village Hall". The first concert was Arthur Sullivan's cantata On Shore and Sea, performed on 1 May 1871.

Many events are promoted by the hall, whilst since the early 1970s promoter Raymond Gubbay has brought a range of events to the hall including opera, ballet and classical music. Some events include classical and rock concerts, conferences, banquets, ballroom dancing, poetry recitals, educational talks, motor shows, ballet, opera, film screenings and circus shows. It has hosted many sporting events, including boxing, squash, table tennis, basketball, mixed martial arts as it hosted UFC 38 (the first UFC event to be held in the UK), tennis, and even a marathon. It has also hosted wrestling, including in 1991 the first official sumo wrestling tournament to be held outside Japan, with a return occurring in 2025. Tennis was first played at the hall in March 1970, and the ATP Champions Tour Masters was played there annually from 1997 to 2021. In April 2026, the hall hosted its first Esports event: The finals of the Red Bull Wololo tournaments for Age of Empires IV and Age of Empires II.

The hall first hosted boxing in 1918, when it hosted a tournament between British and American servicemen. There was a colour bar in place at the hall, preventing black boxers from fighting there, between 1923 and 1932. Greats of British boxing such as Frank Bruno, Prince Naseem Hamed, Henry Cooper and Lennox Lewis have all appeared at the venue. The hall's storied boxing history was halted in 1999 when it lost its licence to hold boxing and wrestling matches after complaints from residents about noise levels. In 2011, after a legal battle, the licence to host boxing and wrestling events was restored and boxing events resumed in 2012. In 2019 Nicola Adams won the WBO Flyweight title which was the first fight for a world title at the venue since Marco Antonio Barrera took on Paul Lloyd in 1999.

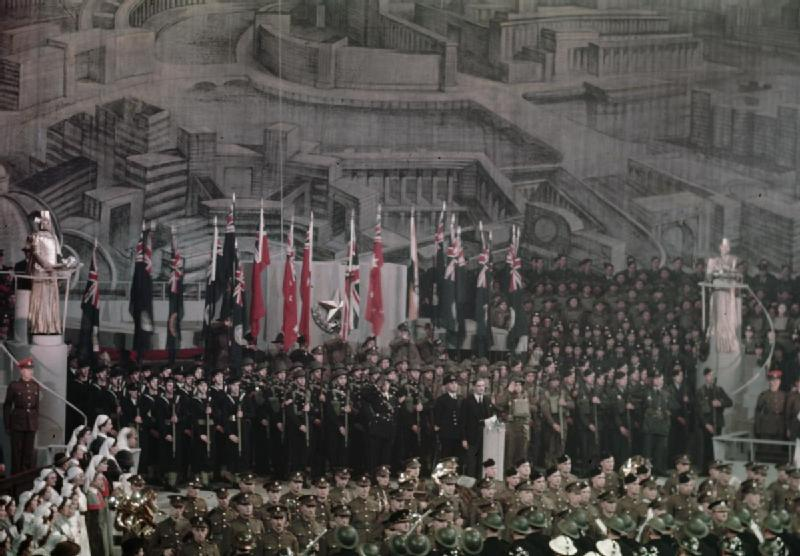
WWII Salute to the Red Army, February 1943

One notable event was a Pink Floyd concert held on 26 June 1969 which involved shooting cannons, building furniture on the stage, and having a man in a gorilla suit roam the audience. At one point, Rick Wright went to the pipe organ and began to play "The End of the Beginning", the final part of "Saucerful of Secrets", joined by the brass section of the Royal Philharmonic Orchestra (led by the conductor, Norman Smith) and the ladies of the Ealing Central Amateur Choir. A portion of the pipe organ recording is included on Pink Floyd's album The Endless River.

In November 1969, Petula Clark performed an historic sold-out concert, significantly filmed for the first colour broadcast on BBC. "Petula Clark in Concert at The Royal Albert Hall" was screened in colour at 1 minute past midnight on 15 November 1969.

In 1983, Siouxsie and the Banshees performed two sold-out concerts at the hall; at the time, their lineup featured the Cure's guitarist Robert Smith. The shows were recorded and filmed for the live album and DVD Nocturne.

On 22 September 2011, Adele performed a one-night-only concert as part of her tour. The concert was filmed for DVD and screened at cinemas in 26 cities around the world. Her performance debuted at number one in the United States with 96,000 copies sold, the highest one-week tally for a music DVD in four years. After one week, it became the best-selling music DVD of 2011. As of 28 November 2012, it had surpassed sales of one million copies in the United States and sales of three million copies worldwide and makes the first music DVD to surpass sales of one million in the USA since Eagles' Farewell 1 Tour-Live from Melbourne in 2005 (Garth Brooks' The Ultimate Hits sold one million copies in 2007, but was a CD/DVD combination). The live version of "Set Fire to the Rain" taken from her performance won the Grammy Award for Best Pop Solo Performance at the 55th Annual Grammy Awards in 2013.

On 2 October 2011, the hall staged the 25th-anniversary performance of Andrew Lloyd Webber's The Phantom of the Opera, which was broadcast live to cinemas across the world and filmed for DVD. Lloyd Webber, the original London cast including Sarah Brightman and Michael Crawford, and four previous actors of the titular character, among others, were in attendance – Brightman and the previous Phantoms (aside from Crawford) performed an encore.

On 19 November 2012, the hall hosted the 100th-anniversary performance of the Royal Variety Performance, attended by Queen Elizabeth II and Prince Philip, Duke of Edinburgh, with boy-band One Direction among the performers. The Royal Variety Performance has since returned to the hall in 2015 and every year since 2021.

In 2017 the hall hosted the 70th British Academy Film Awards, often referred to as the BAFTAs, for the first time in 20 years, replacing the Royal Opera House at which the event had been held since 2008. The BAFTAs were held regularly at the venue until moving to the Royal Festival Hall in 2023. The Olivier Awards also moved to the Albert Hall in 2017 and remain there as of 2026.

Tony Bennett is the oldest known headline performer of the venue, who was 92 years, 10 months and 26 days old on his final show there in June 2019. His first performance there was in January 1971, with the London Philharmonic Orchestra. Other nonagenarians to perform include Charles Aznavour (91 in 2015), conductor Sir Neville Marriner (90 in 2014) and in May 2027, Herb Alpert will be 92 years old when he performs at the venue with the Tijuana Brass.

In June 2025, Irish boyband Westlife announced they would perform there as part of their 25th Anniversary celebrations on the 27 and 28 October.

Former regular events include Classical Spectacular, a Raymond Gubbay production, which performed at the hall from 1989 to 2022. It combined popular classical music, lights and special effects. Between 1996 and 2008, the hall hosted the annual National Television Awards all of which were hosted by Sir Trevor McDonald, and the Classic Brit Awards were hosted annually at the hall from 2000 to 2013, and again in 2018. The Institute of Directors' Annual Convention was synonymous with the hall for over 50 years, taking place most years between 1961 and 2016.

=== Regular events ===
==== Royal Choral Society ====
The Royal Choral Society is the longest-running regular performance at the hall, having given its first performance as the Royal Albert Hall Choral Society on 8 May 1872. From 1876, it established the annual Good Friday performance of Handel's Messiah, and since then only three years have been missed; 1940, 1941 (both due to the Second World War) and 2020 (due to the Covid-19 pandemic). In 2021 the event went ahead a month after Easter, in a special socially distant performance.

==== BBC Proms ====
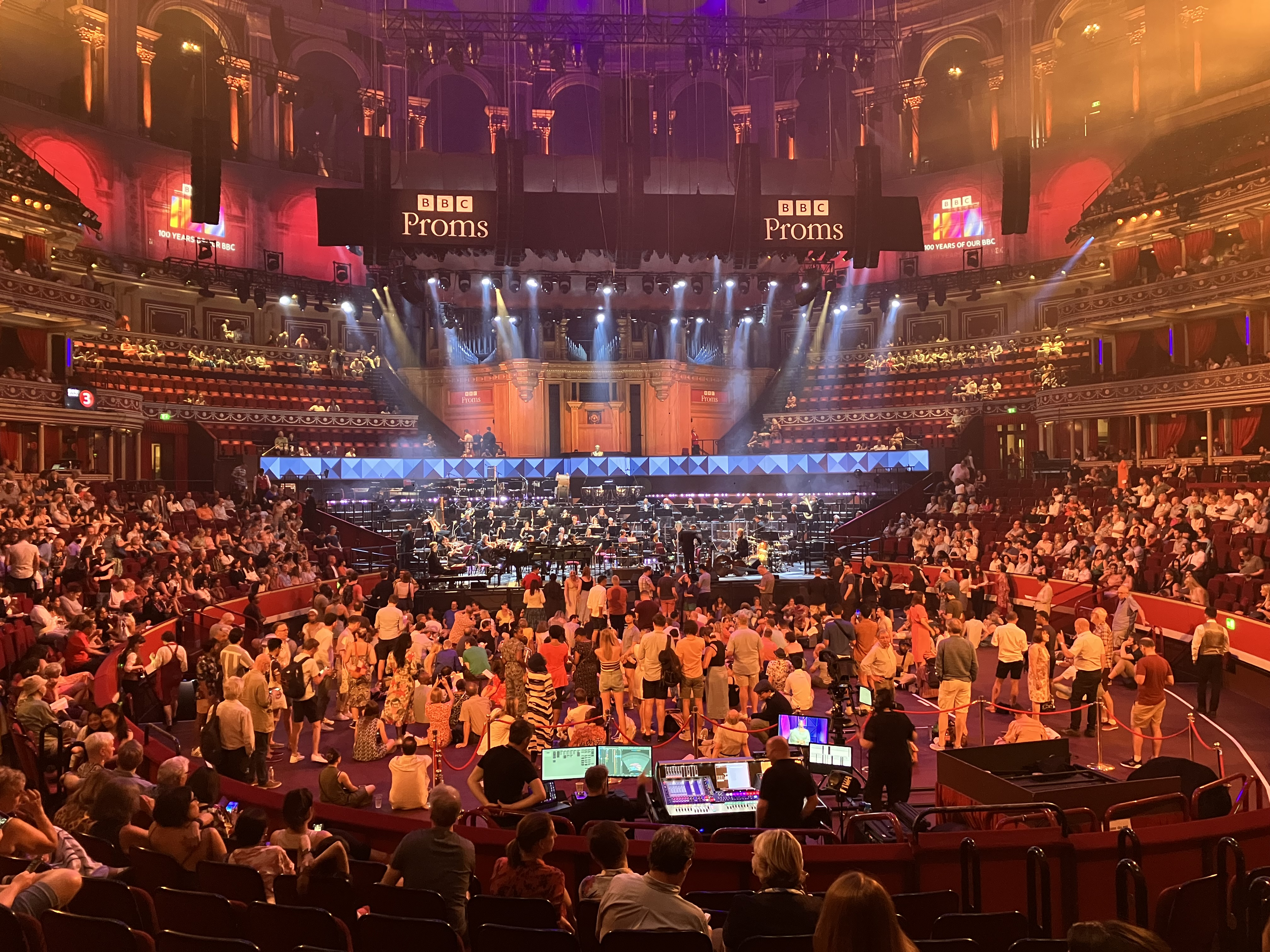
A Prom seen from Stalls K

The BBC Sir Henry Wood Promenade Concerts, known as "The Proms", is a popular annual eight-week summer season of daily classical music concerts and other events at the hall. In 1941, following the destruction of the Queen's Hall in an air raid, the hall was chosen as the new venue for the Proms. In 1944 with increased danger to the hall, part of the Proms season was held in the Bedford Corn Exchange. Following the end of World War II the Proms continued being held in the hall and have done so annually every summer since. The event was founded in 1895, and now each season consists of over 70 concerts, in addition to a series of events at other venues across the United Kingdom. In 2009, the total number of concerts reached 100 for the first time. Jiří Bělohlávek described The Proms as "the world's largest and most democratic musical festival" of all such events in the world of classical music festivals.

Proms (short for promenade concerts) is a term which arose from the original practice of the audience promenading, or strolling, in some areas during the concert. Proms concert-goers, particularly those who stand, are sometimes described as "Promenaders", but are most commonly referred to as "Prommers".

==== Cirque du Soleil ====
Cirque du Soleil has performed annually, with a show being staged at the start of most years since 1996. Cirque has had to adapt many of their touring shows to perform at the venue, modifying the set, usually built for arenas or big top tents instead. The following shows have played the RAH: Saltimbanco (1996, 1997 and 2003), Alegría (1998, 1999, 2006 and 2007), Dralion (2004 and 2005), Varekai (2008 and 2010), Quidam (2009 and 2014), Totem (2011, 2012 and 2019), Koozå (2013 and 2015), Amaluna (2016 and 2017), OVO (2018 and 2026), Luzia (2020 and 2022), Kurios (2023 and 2027), Alegría: In a New Light (2024) and Corteo (2025). In October 2026, it was announced that 2028 would be the last year of Cirque du Soleil at the Royal Albert Hall, with a new programme of events taking over in January and February from the following year.

==== Classic FM Live ====
Classic FM hold a popular concert twice a year with a regularly changing lineup. The concert in September 2013 had to be cancelled due to a fire alert in the hall's basement leading to an evacuation of the building

==== Festival of Remembrance ====
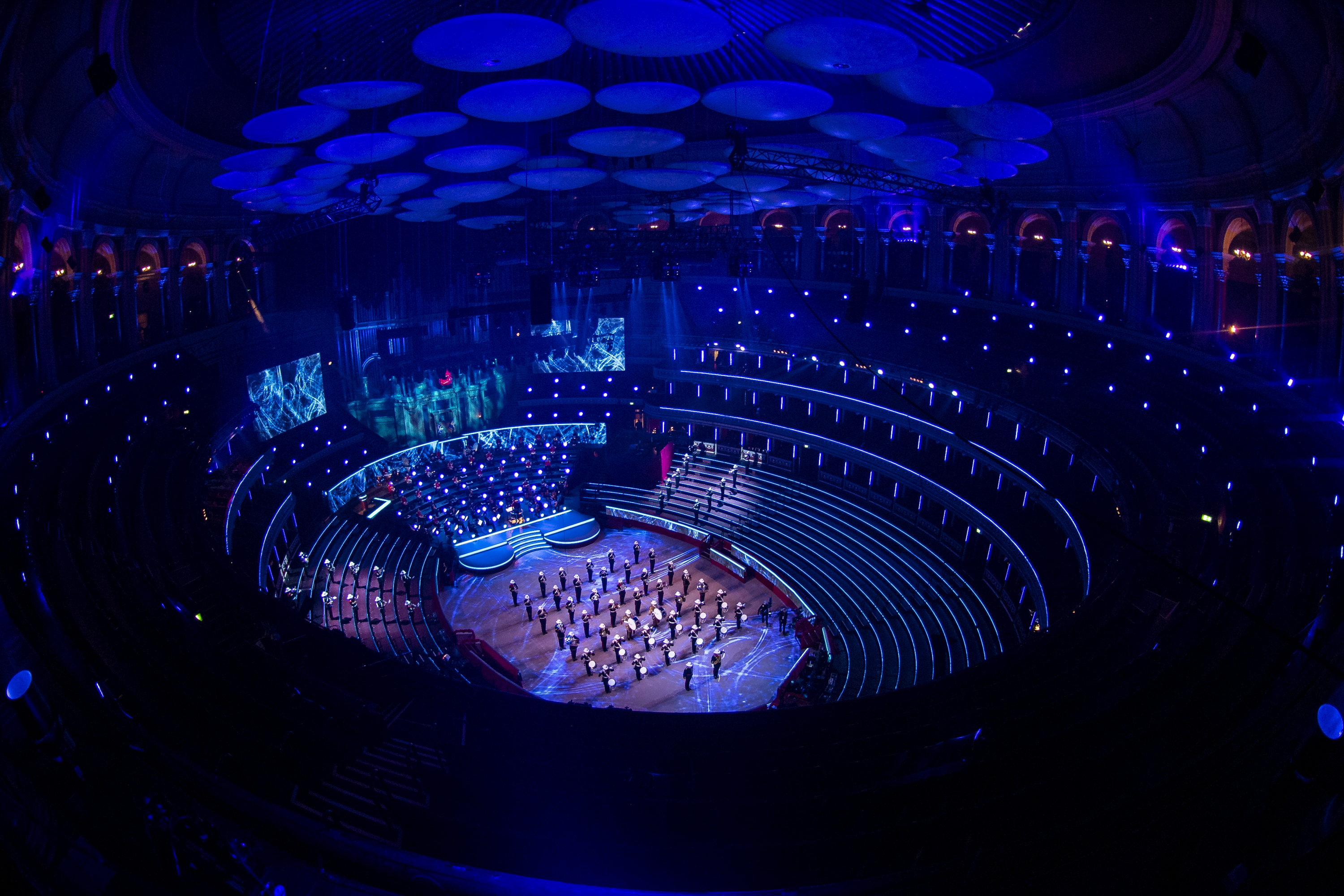
Festival of Remembrance, 2020

The Royal British Legion Festival of Remembrance is held annually the day before Remembrance Sunday. The Royal Family regularly attend, and November 2019's event was the last performance attended by Queen Elizabeth II before her death three years later. Her first show was in December 1934, when aged 8 she watched a Christmas Carol concert there with her mother Elizabeth, Duchess of York, and younger sister Princess Margaret.

==== English National Ballet ====
Since 1997 the English National Ballet has had several specially staged arena summer seasons in partnership with the hall. Swan Lake is the most frequent, being performed here on multiple occasions since 1997 in the form of a unique in-the-round production choreographed by Derek Deane, with the next run scheduled in June 2027. Other ballets include The Sleeping Beauty in April – June 2000 and June 2026, Romeo & Juliet (Deane) in June 2001 and 2005, Strictly Gershwin in June 2008 and 2011, and Cinderella in June 2019 and 2023.

==== The Salvation Army ====
The hall has a long association with The Salvation Army, hosting over 400 events since 1895. It continues to host the Salvation Army's annual Christmas concert, featuring celebrity guests and Salvation Army musicians, including the International Staff Songsters and International Staff Band.

==== Teenage Cancer Trust ====
Starting in 2000 the Teenage Cancer Trust has held annual charity concerts in most years. They started as a one-off event but have expanded over the years to a week or more of evening events. Roger Daltrey of The Who was intimately involved with the planning of the events until 2024, his final year in charge included performances from Young Fathers, Noel Gallagher and The Chemical Brothers. Subsequent years have had guest curators such as Robert Smith in 2026, and Shirley Manson in 2027.

==== Graduation ceremonies ====
The hall is used annually by the neighbouring Imperial College London for graduation ceremonies. For several years the Royal College of Art, University of London and Kingston University also held their graduation ceremonies at the hall.

==== National Brass Band Championships of Great Britain ====
§ The National Brass Band Championships of Great Britain, one of the most prestigious prizes in the annual brass band contesting calendar, holds the Final of the Championship section at the Royal Albert Hall each October.

==== Films, premières and live orchestra screenings ====
The venue has screened several films since the early silent days. It was the only London venue to show William Fox's The Queen of Sheba in the 1920s.

The hall has hosted many premières, including the UK première of Fritz Lang's Die Nibelungen, 101 Dalmatians on 4 December 1996, the European première of Spandau Ballet's Soul Boys of the Western World and four James Bond royal world premières; Die Another Day on 18 November 2002 (attended by Queen Elizabeth II and Prince Philip), Skyfall on 23 October 2012 (attended by Charles, Prince of Wales and Camilla, Duchess of Cornwall), Spectre on 26 October 2015 (attended by Prince William, Duke of Cambridge and Catherine, Duchess of Cambridge) and No Time to Die on 28 September 2021 (attended by Charles, Camilla, William, Catherine).

The hall held its first 3D film – the world première of Titanic 3D, on 27 March 2012, with James Cameron and Kate Winslet in attendance. Since 2009, the hall has also curated regular seasons of English-language film-and-live-orchestra screenings, including The Lord of the Rings trilogy, Gladiator, Star Trek, Star Trek Into Darkness, Interstellar, The Matrix, West Side Story, Breakfast at Tiffany's, Matilda, Back to the Future, Ghostbusters, Jaws, the Harry Potter series, Black Panther, and the world première of Titanic Live in Concert. The first non-English-language movie to screen at the hall was Baahubali: The Beginning (an Indian movie in Telugu and Tamil, but premiered Hindi dubbed version).

==== Beyond the main stage ====
The hall hosts hundreds of events and activities beyond its main auditorium. There are regular free art exhibitions in the ground floor Amphi corridor, which can be viewed when attending events or on dedicated viewing dates. Visitors can take a guided tour of the hall on most days, which includes most front-of-house areas, the auditorium, the Gallery and the Royal Retiring Room. Other tours include Behind the Scenes, Inside Out and school tours. Children's events include Storytelling and Music Sessions for ages four and under. These take place in the Door 3 Porch and Albert's Band sessions in the Elgar Room during school holidays. "Late Night Jazz" events in the Elgar Room, generally on a Thursday night, feature cabaret-style seating and a relaxed atmosphere with drinks available. "Classical Coffee Mornings" are held on Sundays in the Elgar Room with musicians from the Royal College of Music accompanied with drinks and pastries.

=== Regular performers ===
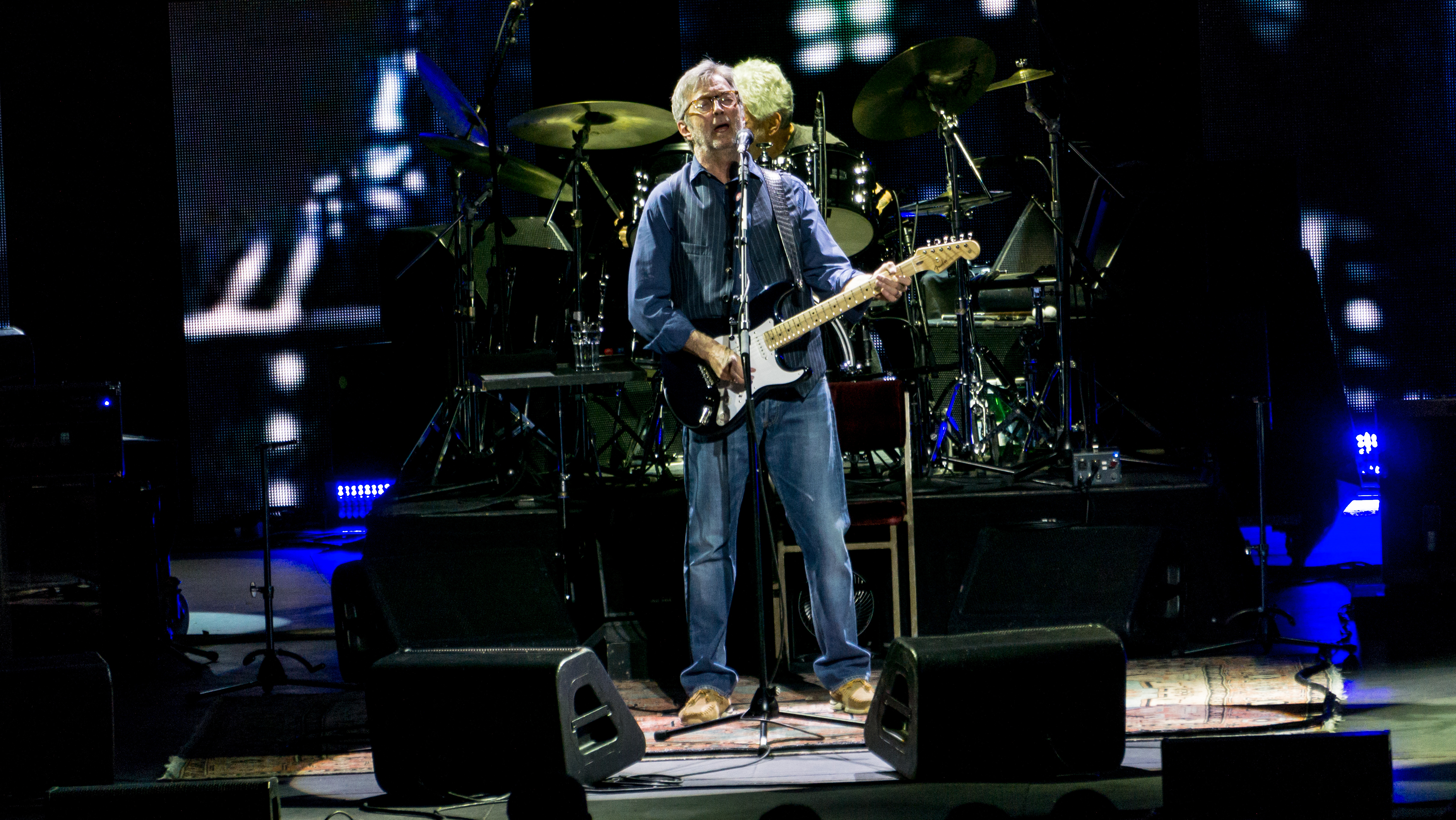
Eric Clapton performing on stage at the hall in May 2017

Eric Clapton is a regular performer at the hall. Since 1964, Clapton has performed there over 200 times, and has stated that performing at the venue is like "playing in my front room". In December 1964, Clapton made his first appearance at the hall with the Yardbirds. It was also the venue for his band Cream's farewell concerts in 1968 and reunion shows in 2005. He also instigated the Concert for George, which was held at the hall on 29 November 2002 to pay tribute to one of Clapton's lifelong friends, former Beatle George Harrison, as well as the Jeff Beck Tribute concerts held in May 2023. Clapton passed 200 shows at the hall in 2015, and his next concerts at the venue will be in May 2027.

Petula Clark has graced the stage numerous times since her debut performance at the hall in 1943. Concerts in 1969, 1974 and 1983 are among the most notable as are Clark's numerous appearances at special events, awards and celebration concerts. Clark's 1983 concert was a 40th anniversary concert to celebrate her first appearance at the venue in 1943.

Shirley Bassey is another of the hall's most prolific female headline performers, having appeared there multiple times between 1971 and 2022. Her most recent appearance in October 2022 saw her headline a celebration of 60 years of the music of James Bond, performing "Diamonds Are Forever" and "Goldfinger".

James Last appeared 90 times at the hall between 1973 and 2015, making him the most frequent non-British performer to have played the venue.

== Education and outreach programme ==
The hall's education and outreach programme engages with more than 200,000 people a year. It includes workshops for local teenagers led by musicians such as Foals, Jake Bugg, Emeli Sandé, Nicola Benedetti, Alison Balsom, First Aid Kit and John Legend, science and maths lessons, visits to local residential homes from the venue's in-house group, Albert's Band, under the 'Songbook' banner, and the Friendship Matinee: a concert for community groups, with £5 admission. Each year, the hall runs the "Future Makers" competition to discover and support emerging talent from across London, where eight acts are chosen for the finals to perform in front of a live audience as well as a panel of industry professionals. One winning act is selected to receive a tailored package of support from the Royal Albert Hall and industry partners.

== Management ==
The Royal Albert Hall is managed day to day by the chief executive James Ainscough OBE and six senior executives. They are accountable to the council of the corporation, which is the trustee body of the charity. The council is composed of the annually elected president, currently James Max, 18 elected members (either corporate or individual seat owners) and five appointed members, one each from Imperial College London, Royal Commission for the Exhibition of 1851, Department for Culture, Media and Sport, British Museum of Natural History and the Royal College of Music.

== Awards ==
The hall has won several awards across different categories.

1. From 1994 to 1998 and in 2003, it won 'International Venue of the Year' in the Pollstar Awards.
2. In 2004 and 2005, it won 'International Small Venue of the Year' in the Pollstar Awards.
3. In 2006 to 2010, it won 'International Theatre of the Year' in the Pollstar Awards.
4. The hall has won International Live Music Conference Award for 'First Venue to Come into Your Head' in 1998, 2009 and 2013.
5. From 2008 to 2012, the hall was voted Superbrands leading Leisure and Entertainment Destination.
6. On 17 October 2012, the hall won 'London Live Music Venue of the Year' at the third annual London Lifestyle Awards.
7. The hall won the Showcase Award for Teenage Cancer Trust and Event Space of the Year (non-Exhibition), both at the Event Awards 2010.
8. In 2010 and 2011, the hall won 'Best Venue Teamwork Award' at the Live UK Summit.
9. The 'Life at the Hall' blog won 'Best Venue Blog' at the Prestigious Star Awards in 2012 and the Prestigious Star Award Landmark in 2013.

== Movie appearances ==
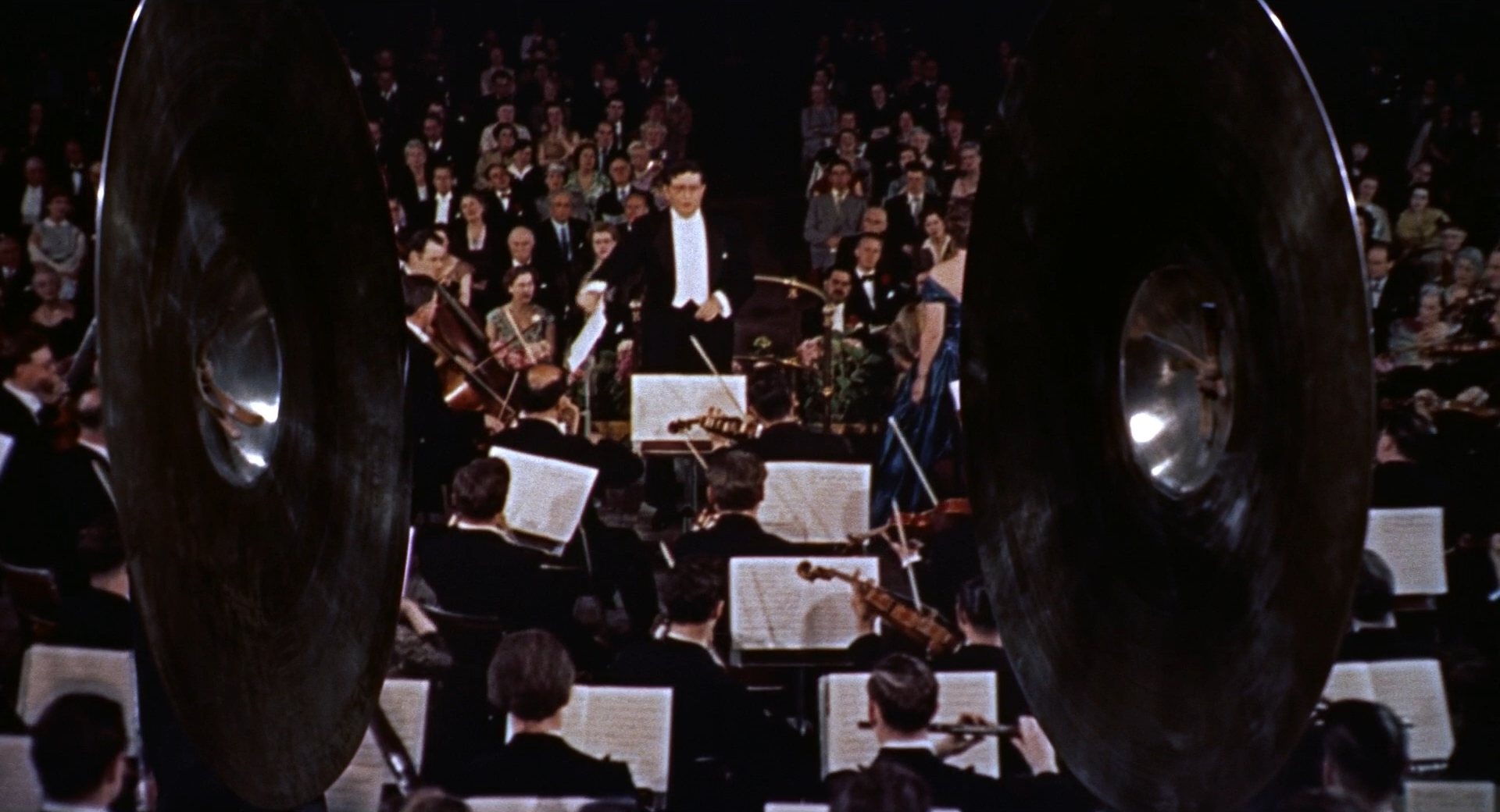
Bernard Herrmann conducting the orchestra in a scene from Hitchcock's The Man Who Knew Too Much (1956)

A large mural by Peter Blake, titled Appearing at the Royal Albert Hall, is displayed in the hall's Café Bar. Unveiled in April 2014, it shows more than 400 famous figures who have appeared on the stage.

In 1955, English film director Alfred Hitchcock filmed the climax of The Man Who Knew Too Much in the hall. The 15-minute sequence featured James Stewart, Doris Day and composer Bernard Herrmann, and was filmed partly in the Queen's Box. Hitchcock was a long-time patron of the hall and had already set the finale of his 1927 film The Ring in the venue, as well as his first version of The Man Who Knew Too Much (1934), starring Leslie Banks, Edna Best and Peter Lorre.

In 2022, the hall was recreated for the climax of the film Better Man, in which Robbie Williams (portraying himself) reenacts his 2001 live performance. While the hall's stage was rebuilt in Melbourne, audience reactions were filmed a year later on location, guided by audiovisual prompts.

Other notable films shot at the hall include Major Barbara, Love Story, The Seventh Veil, The Ipcress File, A Touch of Class, Shine, and Spice World.

== Transport links ==
London Buses routes 9, 52, 360, 452 and night route N9 serve the venue.

The nearest London Underground stations are Gloucester Road, High Street Kensington, Knightsbridge and South Kensington.

== See also ==
- Albertopolis
- The Great Exhibition
- Exhibition Road
- Prince Albert
- List of concert halls
- List of tallest domes

Preceded by Großer Festsaal der Wiener Hofburg; Vienna	Eurovision Song Contest; Venue; 1968	Succeeded by Teatro Real; Madrid
