= William Green (painter, born 1760) =

British painter (1760–1823)

William Green (1760–1823) was an English artist, poet, writer, and landscape painter, who made images mainly of the Lake District, determined to make them "adhere as faithfully as possible to nature." His biographer, Charles Roeder, stated: "his novel method is notable, as the artists have all a conventional and uniform style in regard to the representation of mountains. Those of Mr Green are veritable mountains; he says that he knows their anatomy and he is undoubtedly right."

In 1819, Green completed a major work, The Tourist's New Guide to the Lake District.

His grandson was Walter H Mayson, a British violin maker.
