= Opimian Society =

Canadian nonprofit wine purchasing cooperative

Opimian is a Canadian nonprofit wine purchasing cooperative based in Montreal, Quebec. Established in 1973, the wine club was created by a quartet of British-born Canadians who felt that the selection of wines available in Canada was a poor representation of the quality of wines available worldwide.

Marketed as “Canada’s largest wine club,” Opimian has grown since its inception, as of 2010 acting as Canada's largest wine buying group with more than 20,000 members.

== Overview ==
The name “Opimian” derives from the Roman consul, Lucius Opimius, who discovered the famous 121 BC vintage and gave it only to discriminating wine connoisseurs. Like Lucius Opimius, Opimian sources premium wines on behalf of their members. A purchasing co-operative, they access the diversity of the world's wines within the constraints of the government monopolies and controls.

=== In the Community ===
Opimian is divided into 27 regions, called Opimian Chapters, across Canada, each with a volunteer representative called an Area Representative. The volunteers organize local tastings and create a “social dimension to membership.”

Opimian's mandate is to provide wine education. In March 2008, the board of directors voted to make a donation to the Niagara College Foundation. The donation was made in two parts – a $20,000 Scholarship, titled “The Opimian Society Scholarship” and a $30,000 donation toward the building of the Wine Education Center. The Opimian Society Scholarship was received by one person in 2009 and two people in 2010 and 2011.

=== Impact on Canada ===
Liquor boards and consumers have used Opimian as a de facto test market for new brands. Spain's Freixenet, Australia's Rosemount Estate and Scotland's The Macallan all started out as Opimian selections before becoming mainstays in the Canadian market.

== Wine ==
Ten times a year, members receive catalogues of the wines offered by Opimian. The catalogues are referred to as “Cellar Offerings” and feature different regions.

=== Cellar Offering ===
This is marketed as an educational guide that will provide members with information on wine regions, grapes, vineyards and winemakers; the vehicle for their tasting notes, food pairing tips and cellaring advice. Graphic charts instruct the reader on proper serving temperatures and storage life for the wine. All Opimian wines are sourced by a Master of Wine, Opimian's wine consultant. The Master of Wine is responsible for selecting each of the wines offered, sourcing new suppliers, providing tasting notes, Maturity & Drinkability ratings and answering any wine related questions from members. The wines offered are not available anywhere else in Canada, thus one does not see mainstream, well-known or documented brands. Foreknowledge of purchases is further constrained by a lack of independent ratings and reviews for the wines.

=== Working with the Provincial Liquor boards ===
Opimian has always co-operated with local alcohol monopolies. All Opimian wines are officially imported and cleared by the respective liquor boards in each province, ensuring that all taxes and liquor mark ups are included in the pricing. Members order wine, which is then purchased on their behalf through the liquor boards and distributed through the Liquor Board stores and warehouses.

== Membership ==
Members pay an annual fee of $99 + applicable taxes, depending on their province. Benefits include:

- 10 Cellar Offerings per year
- Access to local tasting events & tours to wine regions
- Regional benefits
- Exclusive Wines & Spirits that have been sourced for Canadians by a Master of Wine selection panel.

== See also ==
- Wine Society
