= Richard Mayson (writer) =

British writer and wine expert

Richard Mayson (born July 1961) is a British author and expert on fortified wines and the wines of Iberia. He is series editor for the Classic Wine Library. He is the author of Lowry's Lamps, published by Unicorn Press and was Pro-Chancellor at the University of Sheffield from 2017 - 2021.

== Career ==
Mayson entered the wine trade in 1984 and spent five years working for the Wine Society, the world's oldest mail-order wine club. In 1987, he was awarded the Worshipful Company of Vintners' Scholarship and spent three months in the vineyards of Iberia.

Mayson is the author of five books relating to the wines of Portugal, was associate editor of Oz Clarke's "Wine Atlas" and currently writes the entries on Port and Madeira for The Oxford Companion to Wine. He also lectured for the Wine & Spirit Education Trust (WSET) and Leith's School of Food and Wine in London.

In 1999, he was made a Cavaleiro of the Confraria do Vinho do Porto in recognition of his services to the port wine trade. He is currently the regional chairman for Port and Madeira wines for the annual Decanter World Wine Awards (DWWA). He has his own website.

Mayson was educated at Uppingham School, Rutland. He graduated from the University of Sheffield (BA Hons. Geography) in 1983.

In 2013, he was appointed as a lay member of Council of the University of Sheffield where he chaired the Alumni Board. On 1 August 2017, he became Pro-Chancellor of the University of Sheffield.

Mayson's book on street furniture in the paintings and drawings of L. S. Lowry, Lowry's Lamps, was published in July 2020 by Unicorn Press.

== Awards ==
In 2004, Mayson won the André Simon Award for his book The Wines and Vineyards of Portugal.

Mayson received the Louis Roederer Award as Wine Feature Writer of the Year for a series of articles in The World of Fine Wine magazine in 2013–2014. He was one of the judges for the Louis Roederer Awards in 2018. Madeira, The Islands and their Wines was shortlisted for the 2015 André Simon Award.

== Selected publications ==
- Portugal's Wines and Wine-Makers: Port, Madeira and Regional Wines (1992), Wine Appreciation Guild, ISBN 978-0932664808
- The Story of Dow’s Port 1798-1998 (1998), (Silva & Cosens), Kingston Upon Thames: Seagrave Foulkes, ASIN B000JUEZWU
- Port and the Douro (1999, 2004, 2013), Infinite Ideas, ISBN 978-1908984173
- The Wines and Vineyards of Portugal (2003), Mitchell Beazley, ISBN 978-1840007336
- Madeira, the Islands and their Wines (2015), Infinite Ideas ISBN 978-1-908984-30-2
- Lowry's Lamps (2020), Unicorn ISBN 978-1-911604-60-0
