= Henry Young Darracott Scott =

British Army general and engineer (1822–1883)

Major-General Henry Young Darracott Scott (2 January 1822 – 16 April 1883) was a British Army officer in the Corps of Royal Engineers. He was best known as the joint designer and builder of the Royal Albert Hall in London.

== Early life ==
Henry Young Darracott Scott was born on 2 January 1822 in Plymouth, Devon. The fourth son of Edward Scott. He was educated privately at the Royal Military Academy, Woolwich. He was the first cousin of the brewer John Edward Scott, father of the Antarctic explorer Robert Falcon Scott.

== Military career ==
Scott obtained a commission as a second lieutenant in the Royal Engineers on 18 December 1840. After training at Chatham, he was stationed at Woolwich and Plymouth and was promoted to first lieutenant on 19 December 1843. He went to Gibraltar in January 1844, where he was acting adjutant of his corps. While in Gibraltar he accompanied Arthur Penrhyn Stanley and his two sisters on a tour in Spain. He returned to England in 1848 and was appointed assistant instructor in fieldwork at the Royal Military Academy at Woolwich. He was promoted to second captain on 11 November 1851, and married in the same year. In 1851, he was appointed senior instructor in fieldwork at the Royal Military Academy.

On 1 April 1855, Scott was promoted to first captain and was appointed instructor in surveying at the Royal Engineer establishment at Brompton, Chatham. He became a close adviser of the commandant, Colonel Henry Drury Harness, in the reorganization of this army school. He charged the chemical laboratory. He revised the selenitic lime and his system of representing ground by horizontal hachures and a scale of shade at Chatham and adopted it for the army as the basis of military sketching. During his residence at Brompton, Kent, a drought occurred, and he assisted in establishing a waterworks in the Luton Valley.

On 19 May 1863, Scott was promoted to brevet major and on 5 December of the same year to be regimental lieutenant-colonel.

== Commissions ==
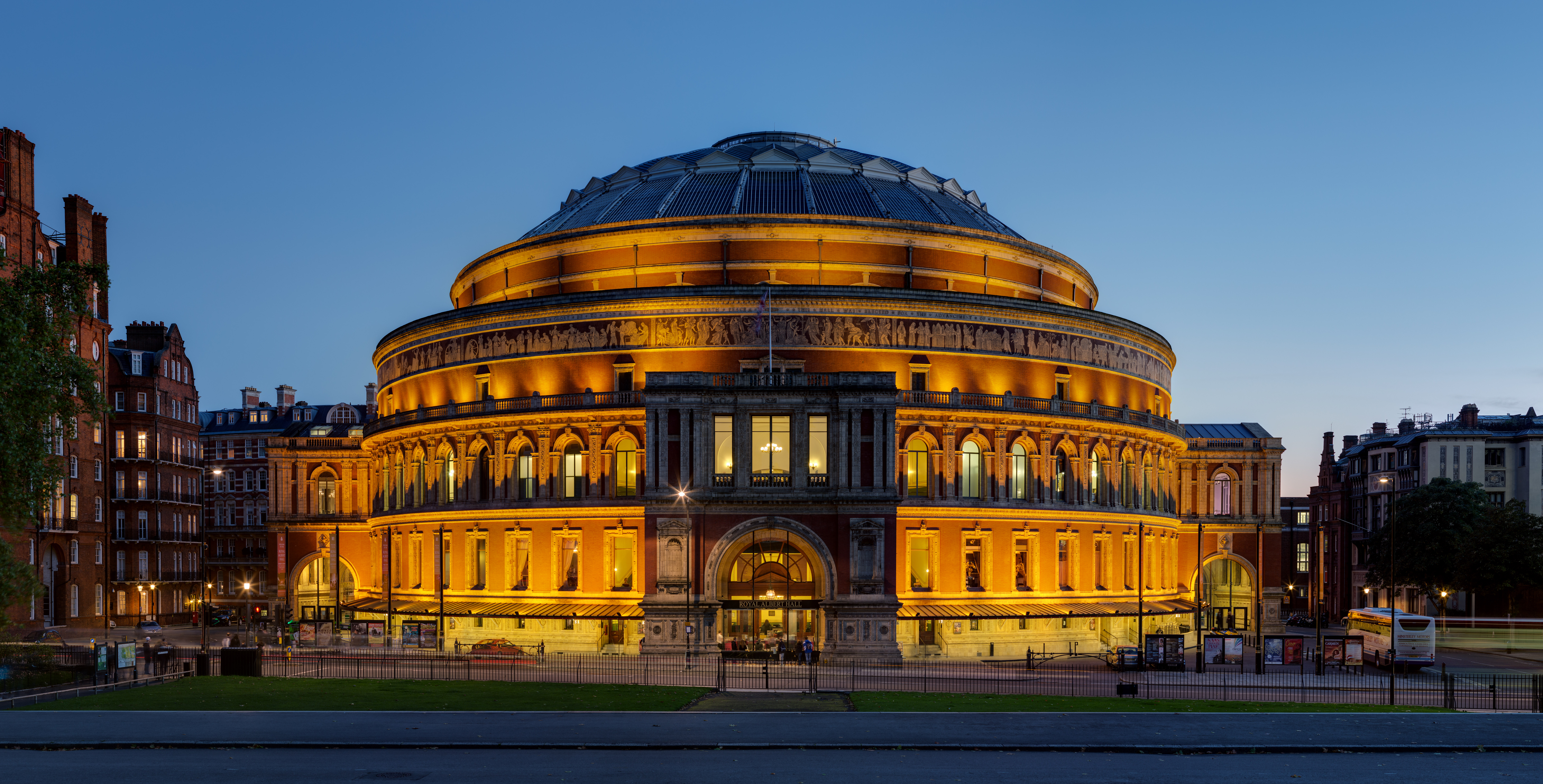
The Royal Albert Hall

On 14 December 1865, he was seconded in his corps and employed under the commission of the Great Exhibition of 1851 at South Kensington in the place of Captain Francis Fowke. On the retirement of Sir Henry Cole, he was appointed secretary to the commission.

In 1866, Scott and Fowke were entrusted with the design and execution of the Royal Albert Hall at Kensington. When the removal of the scaffolding that supported the roof was presented in 1870 Scott sent everyone out of the building and knocked the final support himself. At first, there was an echo with wind instruments, which dealt with the introduction of a "velarium" below the true roof.

On 20 May 1871, Scott was made a Companion of the Bath (civil division). On 7 June 1871 he was promoted to be brevet colonel and on 19 August of the same year, he retired from the army as an honorary major-general but continued in his civil appointment at South Kensington. On 3 February 1874, he became an associate of the Institution of Civil Engineers. On 3 June 1875, he was elected a Fellow of the Royal Society. In the same year, he became a member of a select Russian scientific society and was presented by the Czar with a snuff box set with diamonds.

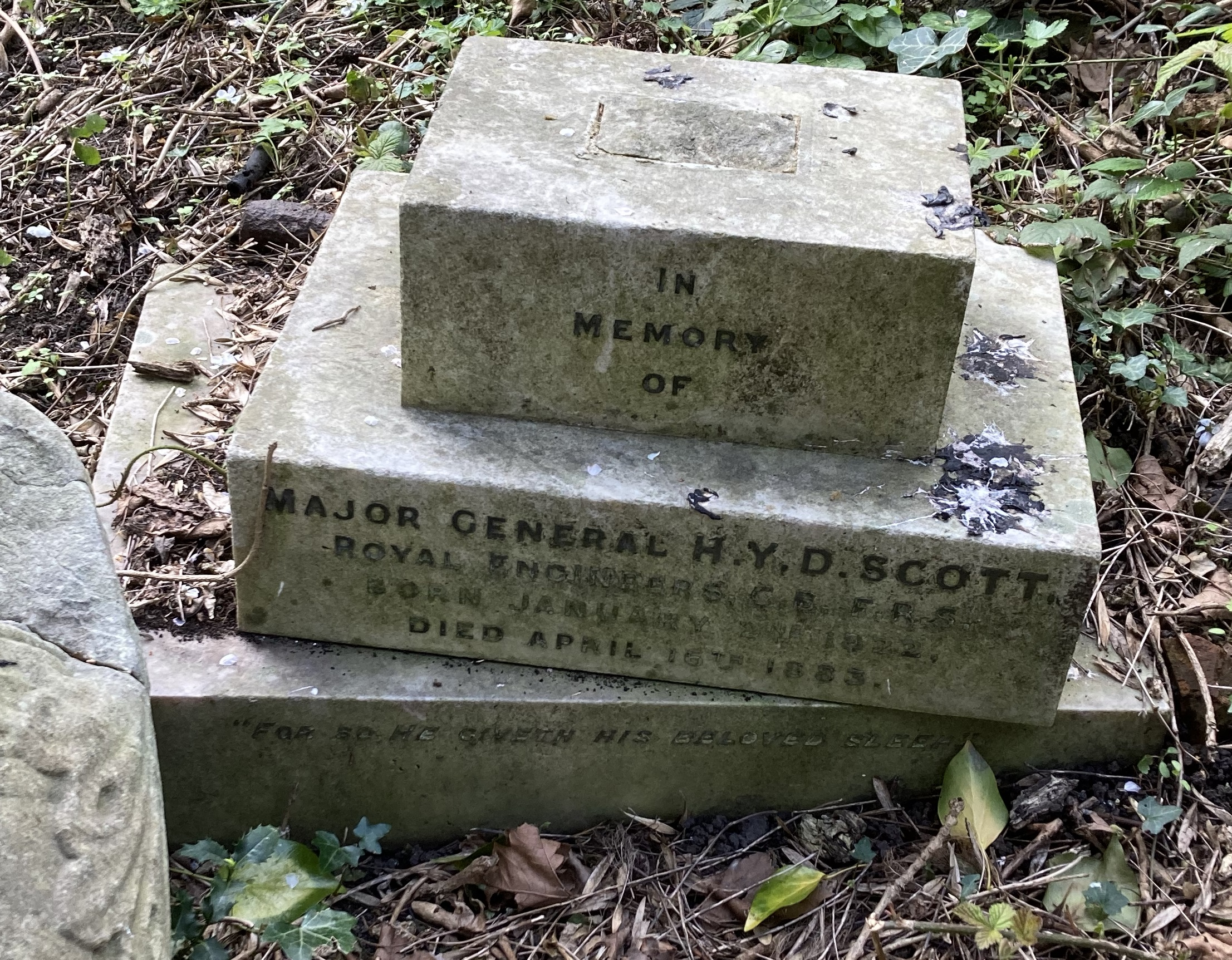
Grave of Henry Young Darracott Scott in Highgate Cemetery

Scott was for some years an examiner in military topography under the military education department. He was awarded medals for service rendered to the Great Exhibition of London in 1862, the Prussian Exhibition of 1865, the Paris Universal Exhibition of 1867, the annual London International Exhibition of fine arts, industries and inventions, the Dutch Exhibition of 1877 and the Paris International Exhibition of 1878. In 1880 he received a silver medal from the Society of Arts for a paper entitled 'Suggestions for dealing with the Sewerage of London,’ and the Telford premium for a paper he contributed to the same year, in conjunction with G. R. Redgrave, to the Institution of Civil Engineers on the 'Manufacture and Testing of Portland Cement.'

He had prepared plans for the completion of the South Kensington Museum when, in 1882, the Treasury, as an economy, abolished his appointment as secretary of the Great Exhibition commissioners. He designed the buildings for the Fisheries Exhibition, but he did not attend the opening.

== The Wine Society ==
Scott is credited with the foundation of the International Exhibition Co-operative Wine Society Limited, which is more commonly referred to as The Wine Society. The Wine Society was established in 1874 initially to sell excess wine stocks unsold during the Great Exhibition and subsequently, on the basis of Scott's proposal, to set up "a co-operative company" to buy wines to sell to members. He served as The Wine Society's first treasurer until his death in 1883.

== Private life and death ==
Scott married on 19 June 1851, at Woolwich to Ellen Selina, the youngest daughter of Major-General Bowes of the East India Company's service. She survived him with fifteen children.

Henry Young Darracott Scott died at his residence, Silverdale, Sydenham, on 16 April 1883 and was buried at Highgate Cemetery.
