= Walter Henry Mayson =

Walter Henry Mayson (8 November 1835 31 December 1904) was an English violin maker.

== Biography ==
Walter Henry Mayson was born in Cheetwood, then a small town about a mile and a half north of Manchester. He was the fourth child out of eleven with five brothers and four sisters. After a few years the Mayson family moved to Cheetham Hill, another two miles away from Manchester. Mrs. Mayson opened a school there with two of her sisters. Mayson was sent to the school and was taught by Thomas Whalley.

At seventeen, Mayson was apprenticed at J. & A. Phillips & Co., a firm of merchants. His sister, Mary Ann, was married to a composer and organist, Joseph Thorne Harris of Manchester Cathedral, Manchester. Mayson spent all of his leisure time at his sister's house, where his love for music was encouraged. Told that his dead grandfather's fiddle was for sale, he struck a bargain with the owner, and started taking lessons. His mother, Elizabeth Green, was the daughter of William Green the landscape painter.

On 18 November 1904 Mayson had a paralytic seizure. On 26 December he had another stroke and did not regain consciousness before his death on 31 December.

== Fiddle making ==
At age 39, Mayson started to make fiddles. He took a room in Barton Arcade, Deansgate, Manchester where he produced 10 fiddles. His first customer, James Fildes, paid £10. During this period Mayson also wrote, and some of his songs and essays were published in Manchester newspapers. In 1899, he wrote a book called Violin Making.
