= The Wine Society =

Wine club in London

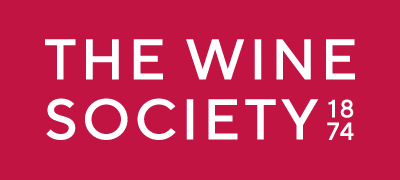
- Type: Online co-operative wine retailer
- Founded: 1874
- Headquarters: Gunnels Wood Road, Stevenage, Hertfordshire SG1 2BT; United Kingdom
- Website: thewinesociety.com

International Exhibition Co-operative Wine Society Limited, trading as The Wine Society, is a British consumer co-operative retailing wine and related services to its members. It is the oldest such wine retailer in the UK, and, according to the Consumers' Association, the best. The society sells only to its members, and each member of the society holds one share in the co-operative, having paid a one-off joining fee.

Founded in 1874 after there was a surplus of wine remaining after an international exhibition at the Royal Albert Hall in London, the society now operates out of a purpose-built warehouse and headquarters in Stevenage, 30 miles north of London.

== History ==
=== Early years ===
The exhibition of wines in the Royal Albert Hall was opened on Monday, and the public were able to visit the cellars occupied by the different nations. Portugal seems most distinguished by the order of her arrangements and the variety of the samples exhibited, which, however, it is said, represent only a small portion of those which the Portuguese Government intend sending. ... The specimens from the different Provinces will be announced successively for tasting when they are ready.

— The Times, 11 May 1874.

The foundation of the Wine Society followed the last of the Annual International Exhibitions held at the Royal Albert Hall in London from 1871 to 1874. Various countries had sent large quantities of wine to the exhibition: there were wines from Australia, Austria-Hungary, California, France, Greece, Italy, Russia, Serbia and Spain, but the country sending the most was Portugal.

When the 1874 exhibition opened (admission one shilling) a supplementary charge of sixpence was made for admission to the extensive cellars, where the wines were on display, but that was quickly waived. Visitors were invited to taste different wines and buy bottles of those they liked. The Portuguese wines occupied an entire cellar, and a large quantity remained unconsumed after the exhibition closed. Having gone to considerable trouble and expense to ship the wines to London, the producers asked the Portuguese government to appeal to the British Foreign Office on their behalf. The British government said that it could not intervene directly, and instead it instigated an unofficial solution to the surplus of unsold Portuguese wine.

The government arranged with Major-General Henry Scott – co-architect of the Albert Hall and secretary to the Great Exhibition Commissioners – that he would host a series of large luncheon parties at the hall, serving surplus wines from the cellars. Scott enlisted the help of two other prominent Victorian citizens: George Scrivenor – a senior Customs and Excise official – and R. Brudenell Carter – a fellow of the Royal College of Surgeons and ophthalmic surgeon at St George's Hospital. Between them, the three chose the wines for the various courses of the first lunch. The wines impressed, and Carter recalled:

a dozen or so of the guests asked to join with us in purchasing, and it was agreed that we should form a small wine club. A second and a third luncheon followed the first, and, by the end of the third, the number of persons desirous of joining the club had so increased that it was decided to constitute it as a Friendly Society, under the law governing such Institutions. McLeod of McLeod became the first Chairman, General Scott, Mr Scrivenor, Sir George Birdwood, the writer [i.e. Carter], and others, were appointed a Committee.

R. Brudenell Carter as seen by Vanity Fair

From the outset the policy of the society was to supply wines and spirits to its members at the lowest possible prices that necessary working expenses would allow. The capital required at the start was lent by members on debentures, which were paid off during the society's first decades. The first wine offered to members was Portuguese: Bucellas (now spelled "Bucelas"), a wine popularised in Britain by the Duke of Wellington, who had encountered it during the Peninsular War. The wine, described as medium-dry "Portuguese Hock", sold at 1s 7d (8p in decimal coinage) a bottle. The society followed this with eight different Spanish wines and a range of Madeiras and sherries. By the following year the society offered a total of 63 items, comprising ports, sherries, claret, burgundy, German wine, champagnes and spirits.

=== Growth ===
Scott became ill and stood down as treasurer of the society; he was succeeded by Carter, who in 1895 became society's second chairman. He remained a member of the managing committee until his death at the age of 90. More than anyone else, according to a successor, Edmund Penning-Rowsell, he was responsible for the supervision and conduct of the society during its first forty years. The society's first cellars, arranged by Carter, were under the Medical Society of London in Covent Garden, after which premises were leased in Mayfair and then at Hills Place, near Oxford Circus in 1902. When the London Palladium was built over the top of the Hills Place cellars in 1910 it raised the average temperatures in the vaults below, and the society successfully sought compensation with a reduction in the rent and an extension of the lease. Cellars were also acquired at Joiner Street (under London Bridge Station) and St James's Bond in Rotherhithe.

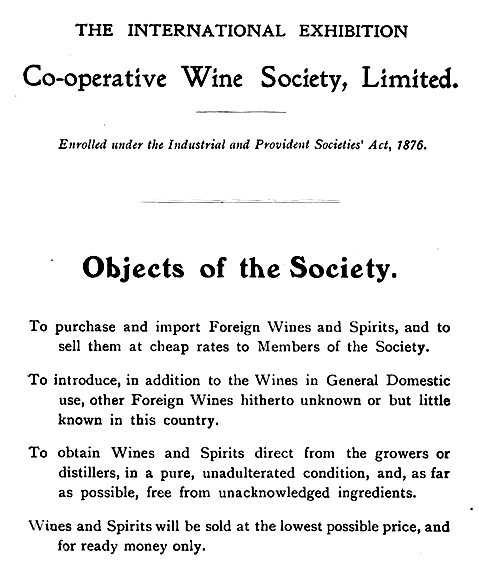

For many years the membership of the society was small. The first annual general meeting, held in the Queen's Room of the Albert Hall in February 1875, was attended by 23 members. In the next few years the average number of new members was not more than 80 a year, and the membership did not reach 1,000 until 1882, when the turnover was £12,187. A turnover of more than £20,000 was not reached until 1916–17, when the value of the stock stood at £15,543 and the number of members at 3,311.

The outbreak of the First World War in 1914 led the committee to ask members to restrict their orders "to 3 dozen wine and brandy and 1 dozen of Champagne at one time", but no more stringent requirements became necessary until the British government imposed extensive restrictions on imports in 1917, at which point the society closed its application list for new membership. In same year the committee took what it considered the patriotic step of disposing of the society's entire stock of German wines. When peace returned in 1918, the application list was reopened, but the committee did not rush to replenish the society's German stocks and did not do so until the later part of 1921 – just in time, Penning-Rowsell comments, for the greatest German wine vintage of the century. (Note: Broadbent, nearly 20 years after Penning-Rowsell, writes that 1921 was "still the greatest vintage of the century. Small crop of extremely ripe, healthy grapes picked early after a scorching summer.")

The inter-war period was one of strong growth for the society: membership increased from 5,000 in 1922 to 10,000 in 1932. The Great Depression caused a drastic drop in worldwide demand for fine wine, and those who could still afford it could get spectacular bargains. The Wine Society paid £12 5s (£12.25) a barrique (Note: The traditional barrique bordelaise is a large barrel containing 225 litres, the equivalent of 300 bottles.) for 50 barriques of Château Beychevelle from 1934, the finest vintage of the decade, according to the wine expert Michael Broadbent. The Second World War caused much greater disruption to the society's activities than had the First. The application lists for membership were closed for seven years: even a king – Haakon of Norway, exiled in London – was denied membership.

=== Post-war ===
After the war the society gradually reestablished itself. The membership continued to grow, and in 1950 several members joined to found the Wine Society Dining Club, arranging tastings and dinners with matured fine wines from the parent society and elsewhere. Large scale tastings were far less common in Britain than they later became, and the dining club was seen as "a unique opportunity to taste wines which most of us would not have the space or patience to mature at home".

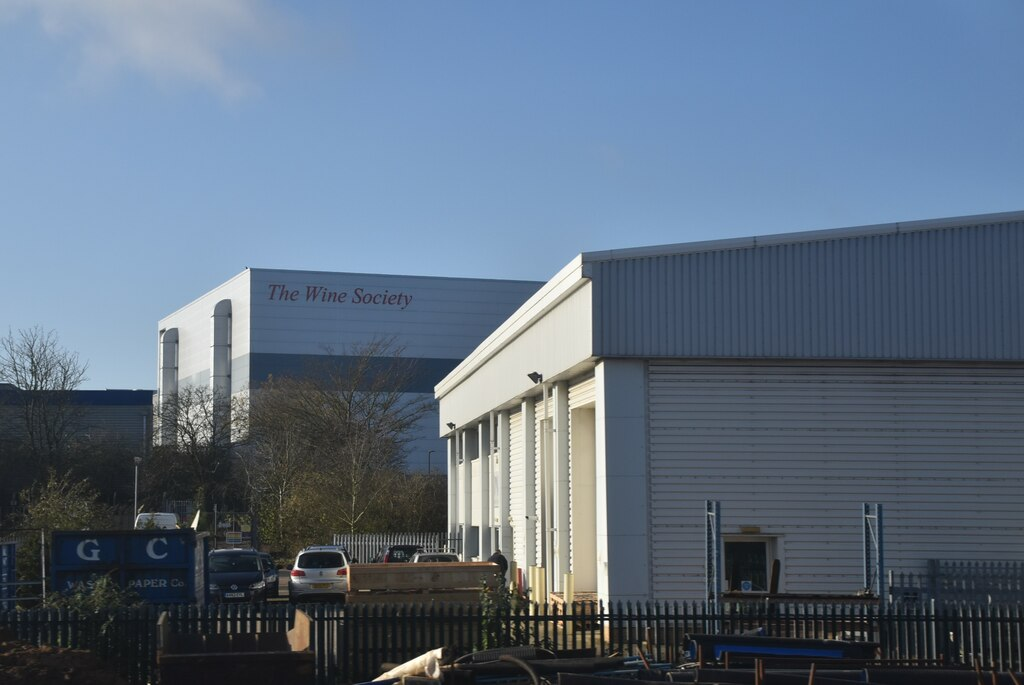
The society's headquarters at Stevenage

Operating from three separate bases in London became increasingly impractical, and under the chairmanship of Penning-Rowsell, who served from 1964 to 1987 the society acquired purpose-built premises in Stevenage, 30 miles north of London. The new headquarters developed over the years to include a bonded warehouse and a wine storage facility with a capacity of 3 million bottles available to members.

The practices of the wine trade gradually altered after the war and shipping in large barrels for bottling in England became increasingly unusual. Bottling by the producers at source became the norm and in 1992 the Wine Society bottled its last wine, a crusted port. The following year the society became the first British merchant to open a showroom in France.

== Membership ==
In the early days prospective members had to be nominated by an existing member, but this stipulation was relaxed and anybody may apply to join the society. Membership is for life and at 2025 costs £40. No purchase is ever required, and there is no charge for delivery within the UK. Jancis Robinson comments on membership of the society, "While prices at the traditional merchants seem to be shooting up, this co-operative buying organisation, whose shareholders are its customers rather than outsiders wanting to maximise profit, has been trying to hold down prices as much as possible while investing in the likes of increased warehousing capacity for its members' reserves and an admirable raft of sustainability measures".

== Reputation ==
In 2025 Which?, the magazine of the Consumers' Association, conducted a survey of the six best-known British retailers of wine via clubs/societies. The Wine Society topped the poll with 93 out of a possible 100 points, 16 points ahead of any competitors. (Note: The others were Laithwaites Wine (77%), Naked Wines (77%), The Sunday Times Wine Club (77%), Majestic Wine (76%) and Virgin Wines (65%)) In The Oxford Companion to Wine, Jancis Robinson writes, "The Society is distinguished by its fair prices, distinguished buying, the efficiency of its bureaucracy, and the quality of wine storage offered to members". The wine writer Oz Clarke comments in his Wine Buying Guide, "If you ever thought the Wine Society might be a bit stuffy, think again. They are constantly probing the four corners of the earth for new taste experiences, whilst also providing a Rolls Royce service for those who prefer something traditional.

== See also ==
- Classification of wine
- Wine tasting
- Opimian Society
- British co-operative movement

== Notes, references and sources ==
=== Sources ===
- Ahmed, Sarah (2015). "Bucelas". In Jancis Robinson (ed.). The Oxford Companion to Wine (fourth ed.). Oxford: Oxford University Press. ISBN 978-0-19-870538-3.
- Broadbent, Michael (1991). The Great Vintage Wine Book II. London: Mitchell Beazley. ISBN 0-85533-909-8.
- Clarke, Oz (2006). Oz Clarke's Wine Buying Guide. London: Time Warner. ISBN 978-0-31-673242-0.
- Knox, Mel; Jancis Robinson (2015). "Barrel Types". In Jancis Robinson (ed.). The Oxford Companion to Wine (fourth ed.). Oxford: Oxford University Press. ISBN 978-0-19-870538-3.
- Penning-Rowsell, Edmund (1974). The Society's First Hundred Years. Stevenage: The Wine Society. OCLC 499342203.
- Robinson, Jancis (2015). "Wine Society". In Jancis Robinson (ed.). The Oxford Companion to Wine (fourth ed.). Oxford: Oxford University Press. ISBN 978-0-19-870538-3.
