= Vic Mayson =

Canadian football player

Profile
- Position: Halfback

Personal information
- Listed height: 5 ft 10 in (1.78 m)
- Listed weight: 170 lb (77 kg)

Career information
- CJFL: Edmonton Maple Leafs

Career history
- 1950–1953: Edmonton Eskimos

Victor Mayson was a Canadian professional football player who played for the Edmonton Eskimos. He previously played for the Edmonton Maple Leafs.
