= El Fenn =

Hotel in Morocco

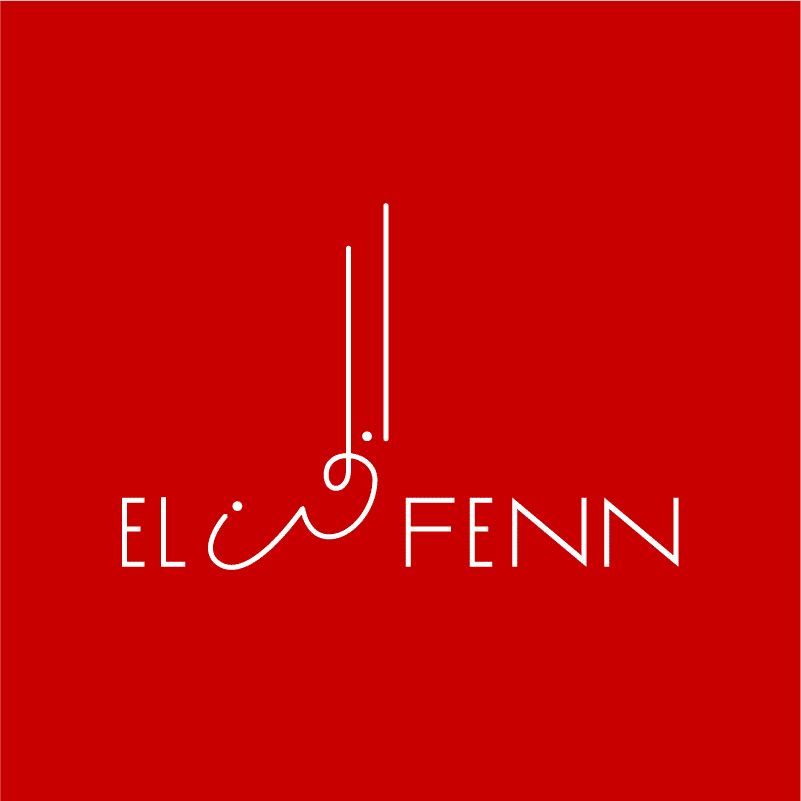

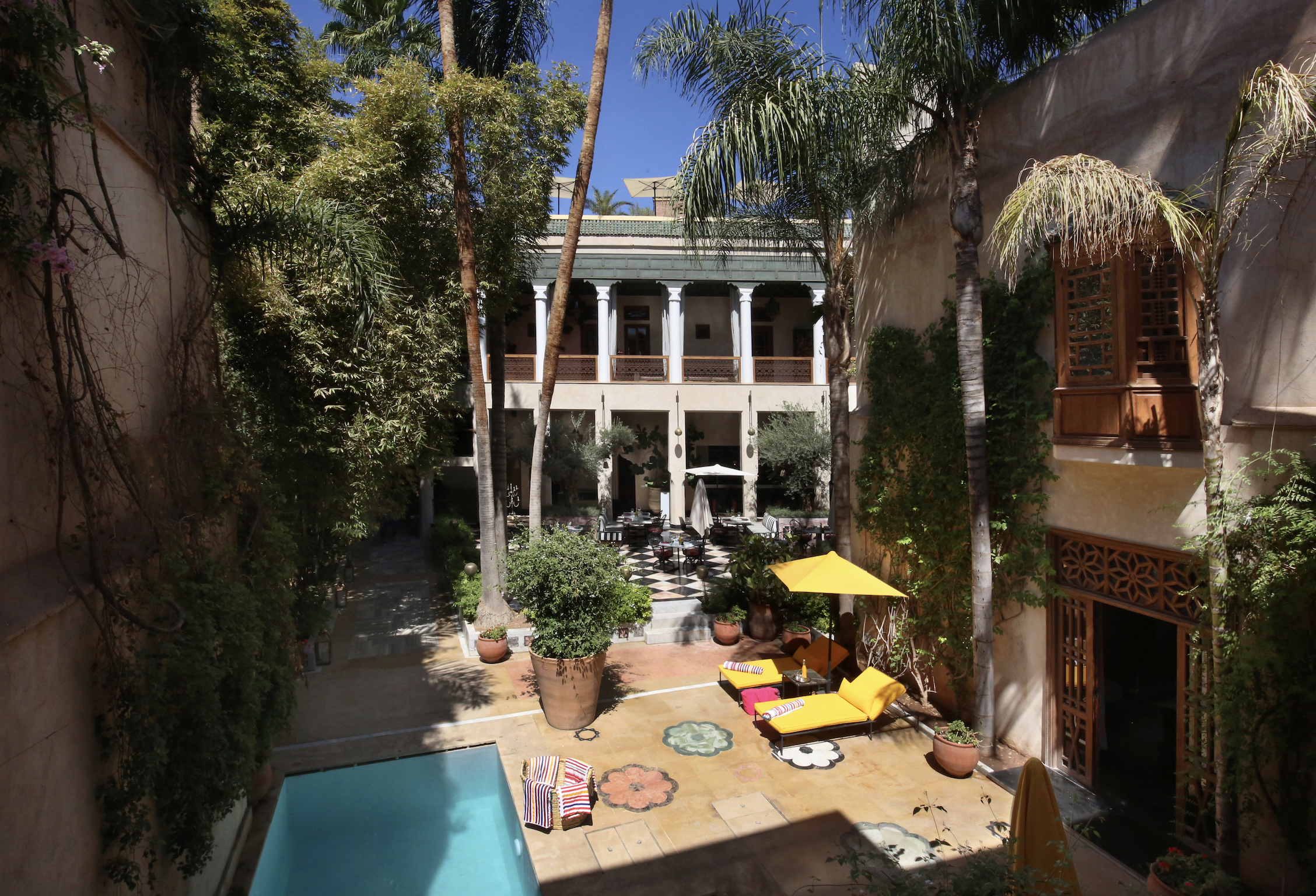

General information
- Location: Derb Moulay Abdullah Ben Hezzian, 2, Marrakesh 40000, Morocco
- Opened: 2004
- Owner: AKAN Collection

Design and construction
- Awards: Conde Nast Traveler Gold List 2017, 2021, 2022, 2024

Other information
- Number of restaurants: 2
- Number of bars: 2

Website
- https://el-fenn.com

El Fenn is a boutique hotel in Marrakech, Morocco, opposite the Koutoubia Mosque. El Fenn has often been listed as one of the best hotels in the world by Condé Nast Traveler being included on their Gold List in 2017, 2021, 2022, and 2024. "El Fenn" means art in the Arabic language and champions Contemporary African Art as part of an extensive art collection within the hotel. El Fenn spans across 8 interconnected riads and features 41 rooms, a rooftop bar, sun terrace and heated rooftop swimming pool, the restaurant open to non residents, courtyard cafe and two further swimming pools. There is a spa and the El Fenn boutique stocks clothes and artifacts designed by young, Moroccan makers who use artisanal techniques to create vibrant, fresh pieces.

== History ==
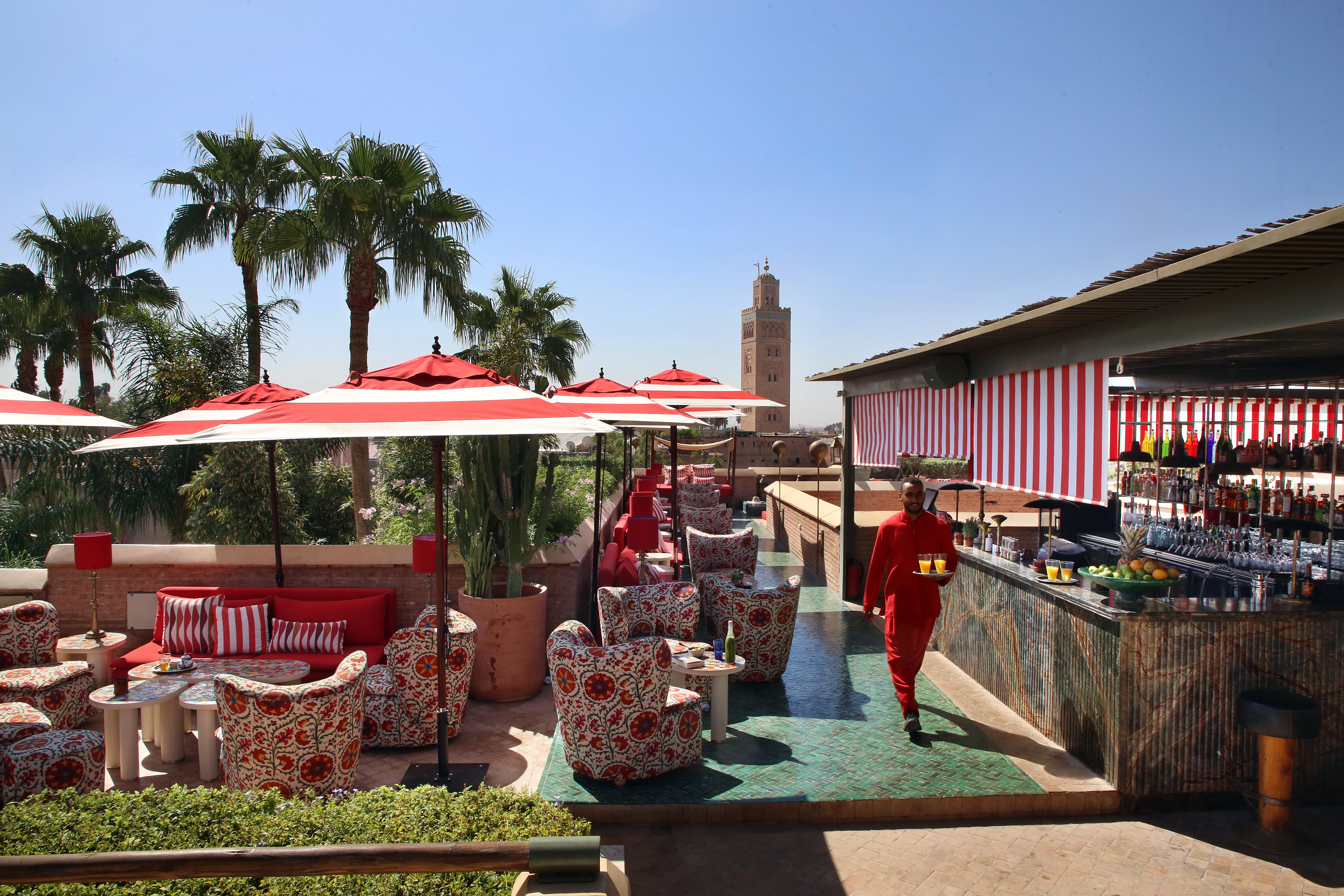
El Fenn Rooftop Terrace

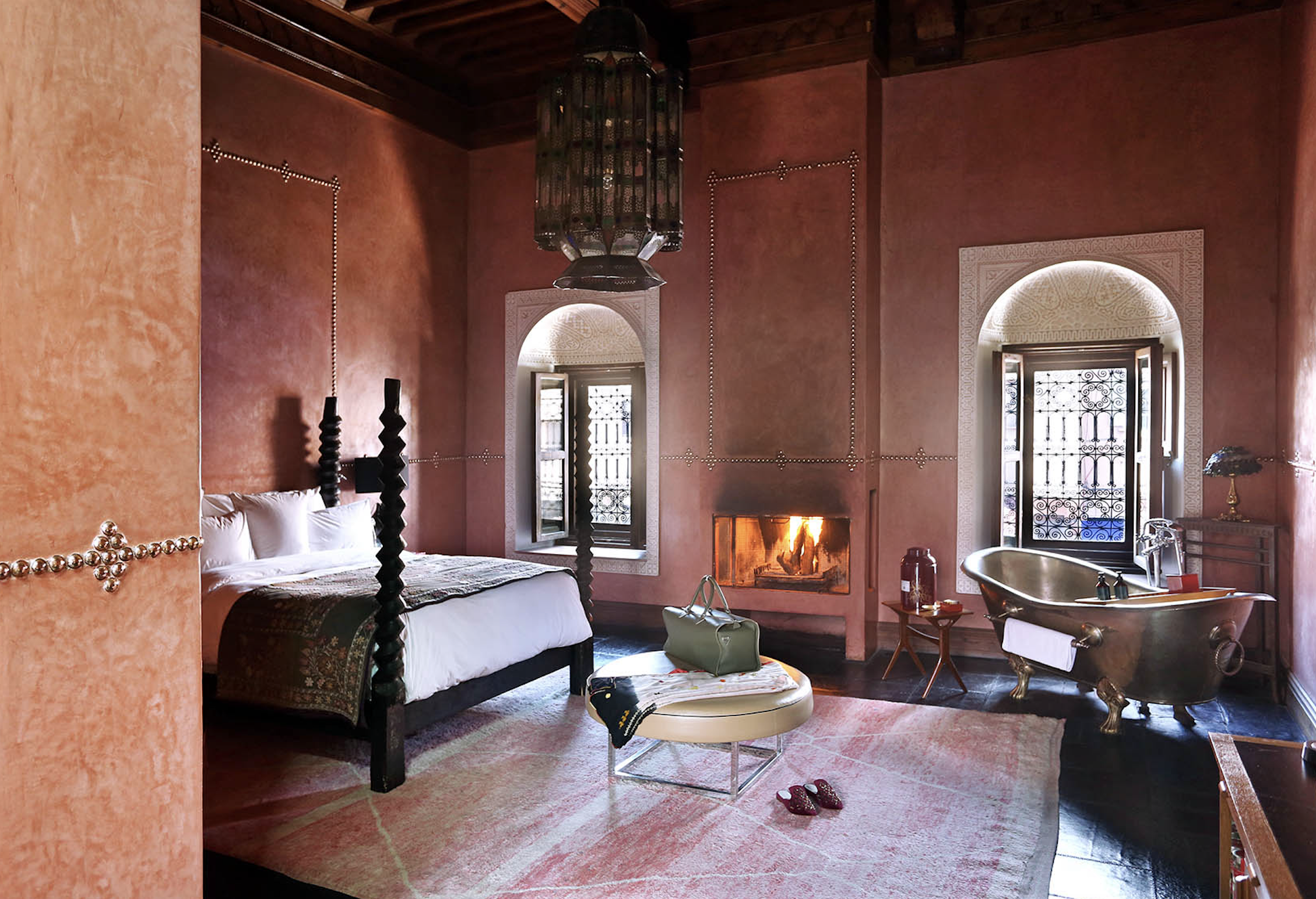

Originally built around 1830, El Fenn was a historic Caïd's palace in the Medina, a World Heritage Unesco site. Vanessa Branson and Howell James bought the site in 2002 that had been divided and different parts owned by different families. They reunited the space and restored it over the next 2 years. The restoration of the ancient historic building was handled with sensitivity retaining many of the Riad's traditional rooms and original features including Zellige tile work, tadelakt, and intricate plaster work. El Fenn opened in 2004 with 6 rooms and over the coming years it gradually expanded into nearby riads. In 2018 Madeline Weinrib and Graham Head became partners.

In November 2025 El Fenn was bought by the Benabbés-Taarji family, and became part of the AKAN Collection. AKAN own two other properties in Marrakech - La Villa des Orangers and Les Deux Tours.

El Fenn has had a cultural role to play in Marrakech, most notably as the hub for the Marrakech Biennale (venue) between 2005 and 2016. Marrakech Biennale participants included Antony Gormley, Alan Yentob, Julian Schnabel, Eric Van Hove, Zadie Smith, Isaac Julien, Faouzi Bensaidi, and Hicham Benohoud. El Fenn was also the venue for TedXMarrakech in 2012 with Hans Ulrich Obrist, Jon Ronson, and Clive Stafford Smith. In 2016, El Fenn hosted key events during Cop22 Marrakech.

Notable guests have included Madonna, Gwen Stefani, Gwyneth Paltrow, Katy Perry, Maggie Gyllenhaal, Hugh Jackman, Carey Mulligan, Antony Gormley, Sacha Baron Cohen, Annie Lennox, Richard E Grant, Julian Schnabel, David Chipperfield, Richard Branson, and Kim Cattrall.
