= Richard Branson =

English business magnate (born 1950)

Sir Richard Branson
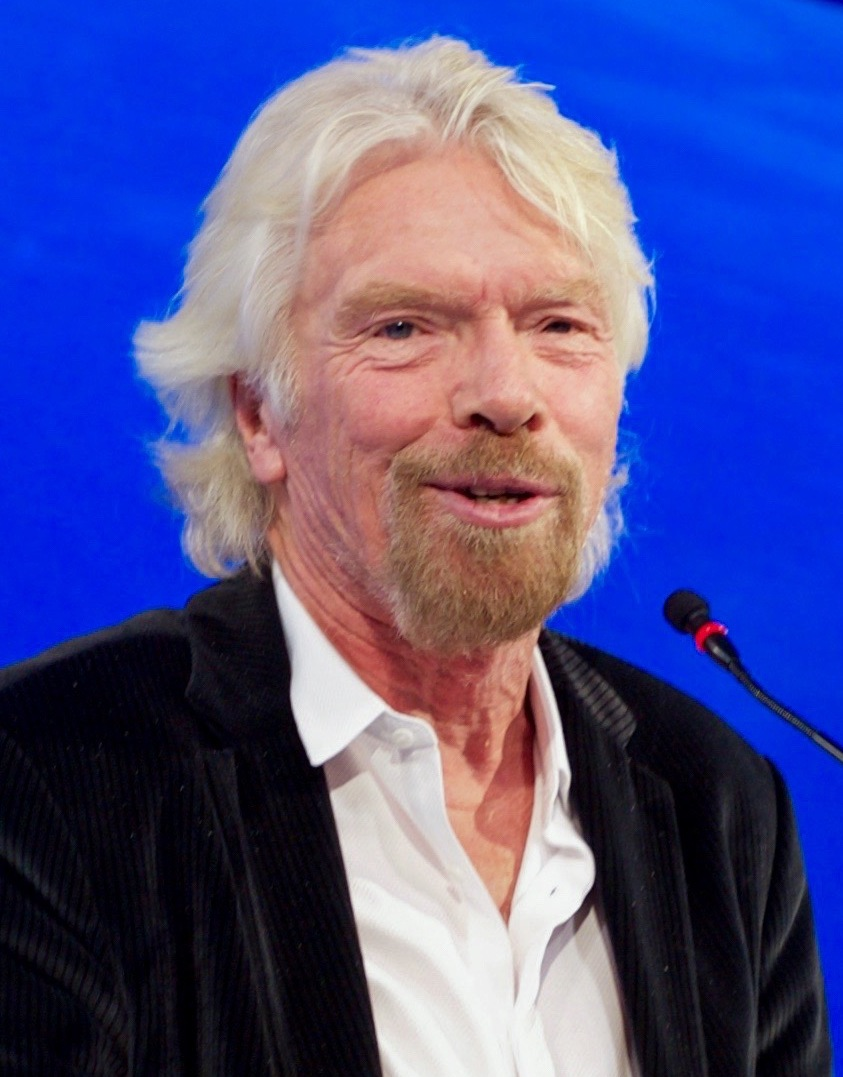
- Branson in 2015
- Born: Richard Charles Nicholas Branson; 18 July 1950 (age 76); Blackheath, London, England
- Occupations: Business magnate; Author
- Years active: 1966–present
- Known for: Founder of the Virgin Group
- Spouses: Kristen Tomassi (m. 1972; div. 1979) Joan Templeman (m. 1989; died 2025)
- Children: 3 (Note: One child is deceased.)
- Mother: Eve Branson
- Relatives: G. A. H. Branson (grandfather); Vanessa Branson (sister); Isabella Calthorpe (daughter-in-law); Kate Winslet (niece-in-law)

Sir Richard Charles Nicholas Branson (born 18 July 1950) is an English business magnate who co-founded the Virgin Group in 1970, and, as of 2016, controlled five companies.

Branson expressed his desire to become an entrepreneur at a young age. His first business venture, at the age of 16, was a magazine called Student. In 1970, he set up a mail-order record business. He opened a chain of record stores, Virgin Records—later known as Virgin Megastores—in 1972. His Virgin brand grew rapidly during the 1980s, as he started the Virgin Atlantic airline and expanded the Virgin Records music label. In 1997 he founded the Virgin Rail Group to bid for passenger rail franchises during the privatisation of British Rail. The Virgin Trains brand operated the InterCity West Coast franchise from 1997 to 2019, the InterCity CrossCountry franchise from 1997 to 2007 and the InterCity East Coast franchise from 2015 to 2018. In 2004, he founded the space tourism company Virgin Galactic, based at Mojave Air and Space Port in California, United States, noted for the SpaceShipTwo suborbital spaceplane.

In March 2000, Branson was knighted for "services to entrepreneurship". Due to his work in retail, music and transport, his taste for adventure and for his humanitarian work, he has become a prominent global figure. In 2007 he was named one of the 100 Most Influential People in the World by Time magazine. In June 2023, Forbes magazine listed Branson's estimated net worth at US$3 billion.

== Early life ==
Richard Charles Nicholas Branson was born on 18 July 1950 in Blackheath, London, the son of Edward James Branson (1918–2011), a barrister, and his wife, Evette Huntley Branson (née Flindt; 1924–2021), a ballet dancer and air hostess. He has two younger sisters, Lindy and Vanessa. His paternal grandfather, Sir George Arthur Harwin Branson, was a judge of the High Court of Justice and a Privy Councillor.

Branson's great-great-great-grandfather John Edward Branson left England for India in 1793; John Edward's father, Harry Wilkins Branson, later joined his son in Madras. Starting from 1793, four generations of Branson's family lived in India, mostly at Cuddalore, in modern-day Tamil Nadu. On the television series Finding Your Roots Branson was shown to have 3.9% South Asian (Indian) DNA, likely through intermarriage. He later said that one of his great-great-great-grandmothers was an Indian named Ariya.

Branson was educated at Scaitcliffe School, a preparatory school in Surrey, before briefly attending Cliff View House School in Sussex. He attended Stowe School, a public school in Buckinghamshire until the age of sixteen.

Branson has dyslexia, and had poor academic performance; on his last day at school, his headmaster, Robert Drayson, told him he would either end up in prison or become a millionaire. Branson has also talked openly about having ADHD. Branson's parents were supportive of his endeavours from an early age. His mother was an entrepreneur; one of her most successful ventures was building and selling wooden tissue boxes and wastepaper bins. In London, he started off squatting from 1967 to 1968.

== Early business career ==
After failed attempts to grow and sell both Christmas trees and budgerigars, Branson launched a magazine named Student in 1966 with Nik Powell. The first issue of Student appeared in January 1968, and a year later, Branson's net worth was estimated at £50,000 (equivalent to £730,000 in 2025). The office for the venture was situated in the crypt of St John's Church, off Bayswater Road, in London. Though not initially as successful as he hoped, the magazine later became a vital component of the mail-order record business Branson started from the same church he used for Student. Branson used the magazine to advertise popular albums, driving his record sales. He interviewed several prominent personalities of the late 1960s for the magazine including Mick Jagger and R. D. Laing. Branson took over full direction of Student after successfully lying to Powell that the workers at the magazine opposed Powell's plans to turn the magazine into a co-operative.

His business sold records for considerably less than the "High Street" outlets, especially the chain WHSmith. Branson once said, "There is no point in starting your own business unless you do it out of a sense of frustration." At the time many products were sold under restrictive marketing agreements that limited discounting, despite efforts in the 1950s and 1960s to limit retail price maintenance. (Note: Another example was the Net Book Agreement, which limited the ability of book outlets, including discount book clubs, to offer deep discounts.)

Branson eventually started a record shop in Oxford Street in London. In 1971 he was questioned in connection with the selling of records declared export stock. The matter was never brought before a court because Branson agreed to repay any unpaid purchase tax of 33% and a £70,000 fine. His parents re-mortgaged the family home to help to pay the settlement.

== Virgin ==
=== 1973–1980: Founding of Virgin Records ===
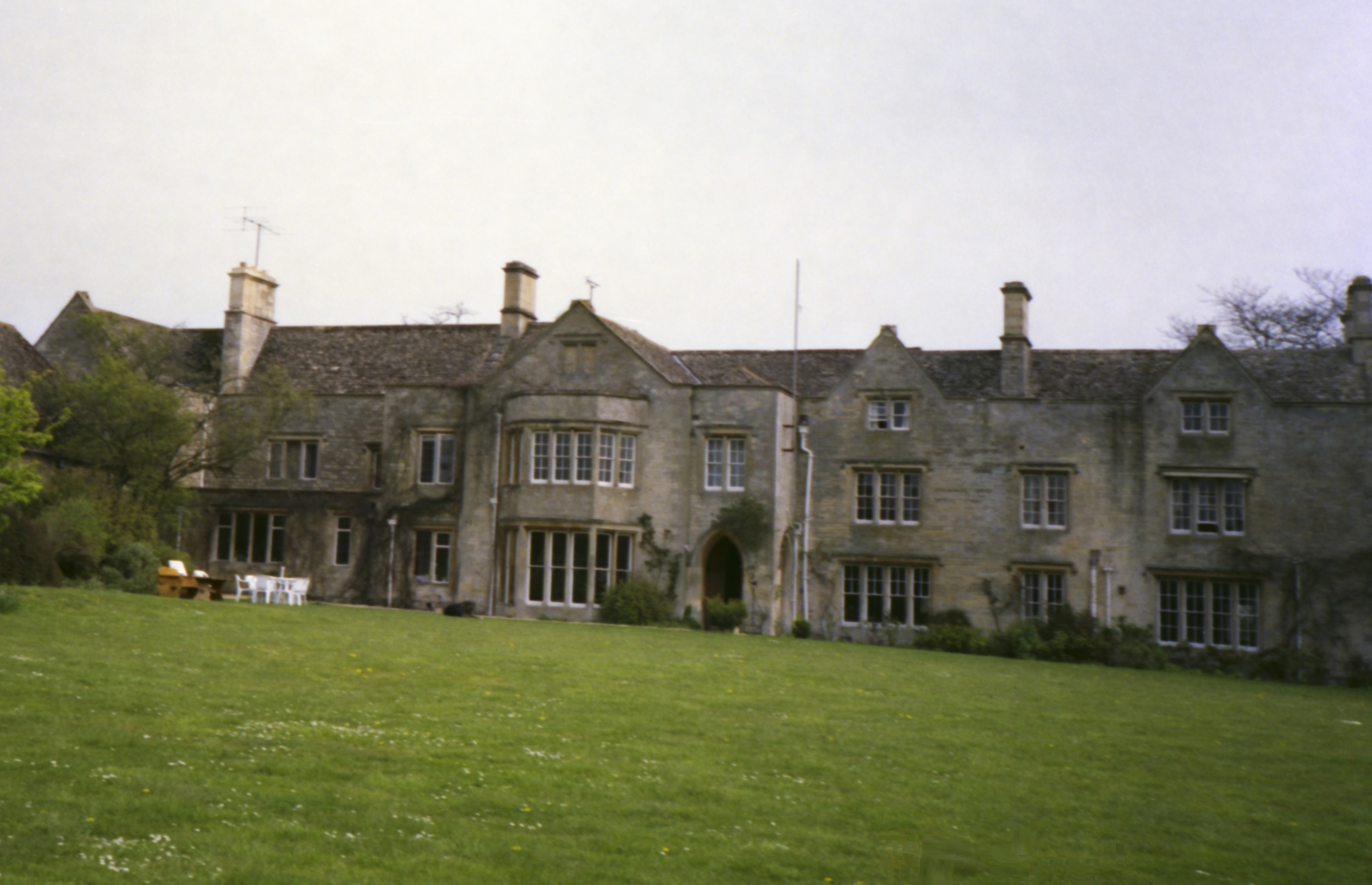
The Manor Studio, Richard Branson's recording studio in the manor house at the village of Shipton-on-Cherwell in Oxfordshire

In 1972, using money earned from his record store, Branson launched the record label Virgin Records with Powell. The name "Virgin" was suggested by one of Branson's early employees because they were all new to business. Branson bought a country estate north of Oxford in which he installed a residential recording studio, The Manor Studio. He leased studio time to fledgling artists, including the multi-instrumentalist Mike Oldfield, whose debut album, Tubular Bells (1973), was the first release for Virgin Records and became a chart-topping best-seller.

Virgin signed controversial bands such as the Sex Pistols, which other companies were reluctant to sign. Virgin Records would go on to sign other artists including the Rolling Stones, Peter Gabriel, XTC, Japan, UB40, Steve Winwood and Paula Abdul, and to become the world's largest independent record label. It also won praise for exposing the public to such lesser known avant-garde music as that of the German bands Faust and Can. Virgin Records also introduced Culture Club to the music world.

Branson's net worth was estimated at £5 million by 1979, and a year later, Virgin Records went international.

=== 1981–1987: Package holiday industries, compilation albums, and Virgin Atlantic ===
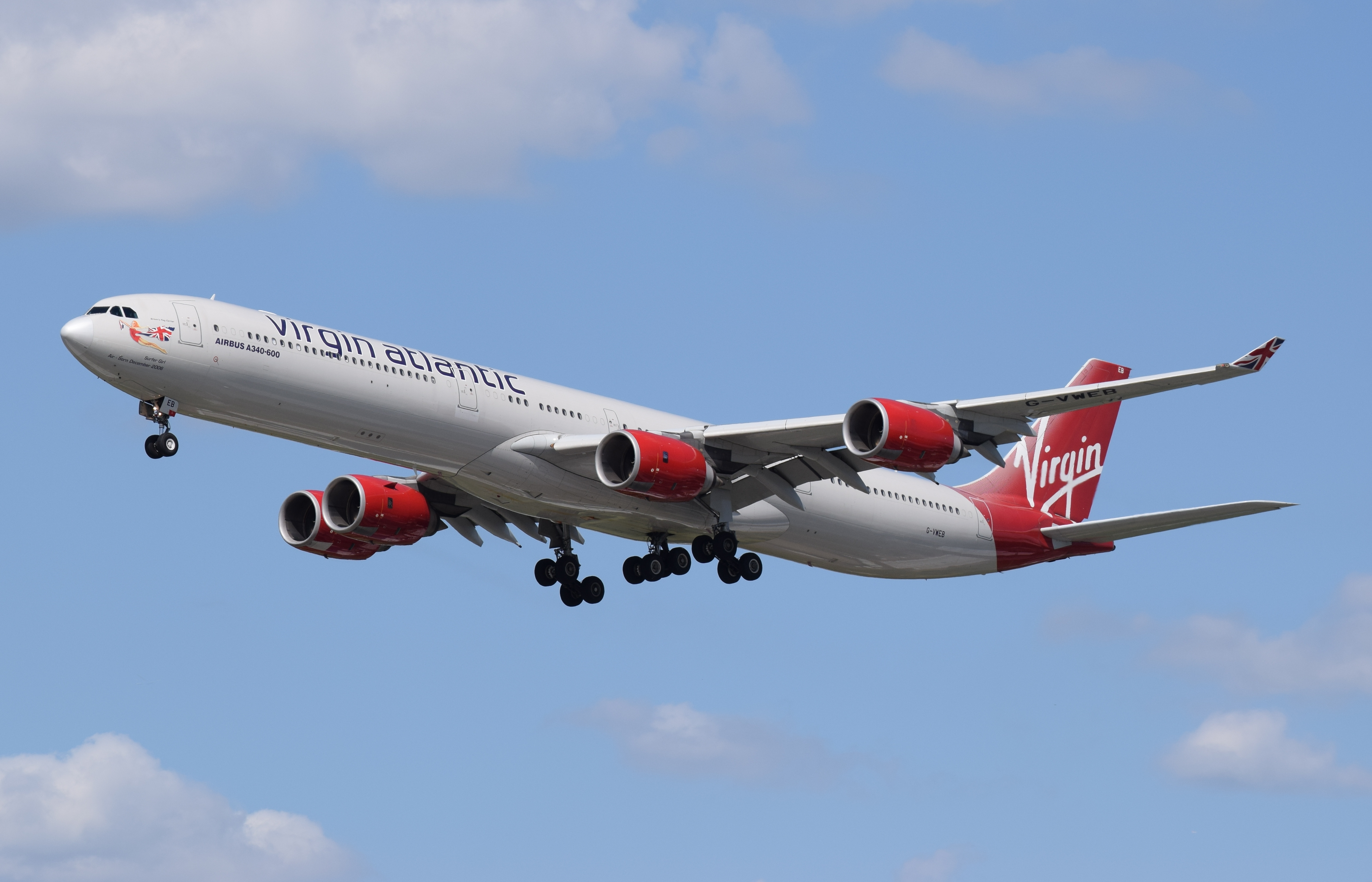
Virgin Atlantic Airbus A340 approaching Heathrow Airport in June 2015

Branson's first successful entry into the airline industry was during a trip to Puerto Rico. His flight was cancelled, so he decided to charter his own plane the rest of the way and offered a ride to the rest of the stranded passengers for a small fee to cover the cost.

In 1982, Virgin purchased the gay bar Heaven in London. In 1991, in a consortium with David Frost, Branson made an unsuccessful bid for three ITV franchises under the CPV-TV name. The early 1980s also saw his only attempt as a producer—on the novelty record "Baa, Baa, Black Sheep", by The Singing Sheep in association with Doug McLean and Grace McDonald, on which he was credited as "Jeff Mutton". The track consisted of samples of animal noises recorded at his aunt Claire Hoares' farm in Norfolk, set to a drum-machine-produced track and reached number 42 in the UK charts in 1982.

In 1983, Now That's What I Call Music! emerged from Virgin Records offices as a compilation series. Collaborating with EMI, Peter Jamieson orchestrated the partnership on Branson's boat, leading to the concise and influential title "Now That's What I Call Music!", inspired by a Danish Bacon poster gifted to Simon Draper. Branson's introduction to the antique shop owned by Joan Templeman, played a pivotal role in his growing fascination with old signs and advertisements, ultimately shaping the collection.

Branson formed Virgin Games in 1983. Virgin Atlantic and Virgin Cargo were started in 1984. He formed Virgin Holidays in 1985.

=== 1988–2000: Telecoms ventures, railways, and worldwide impact ===
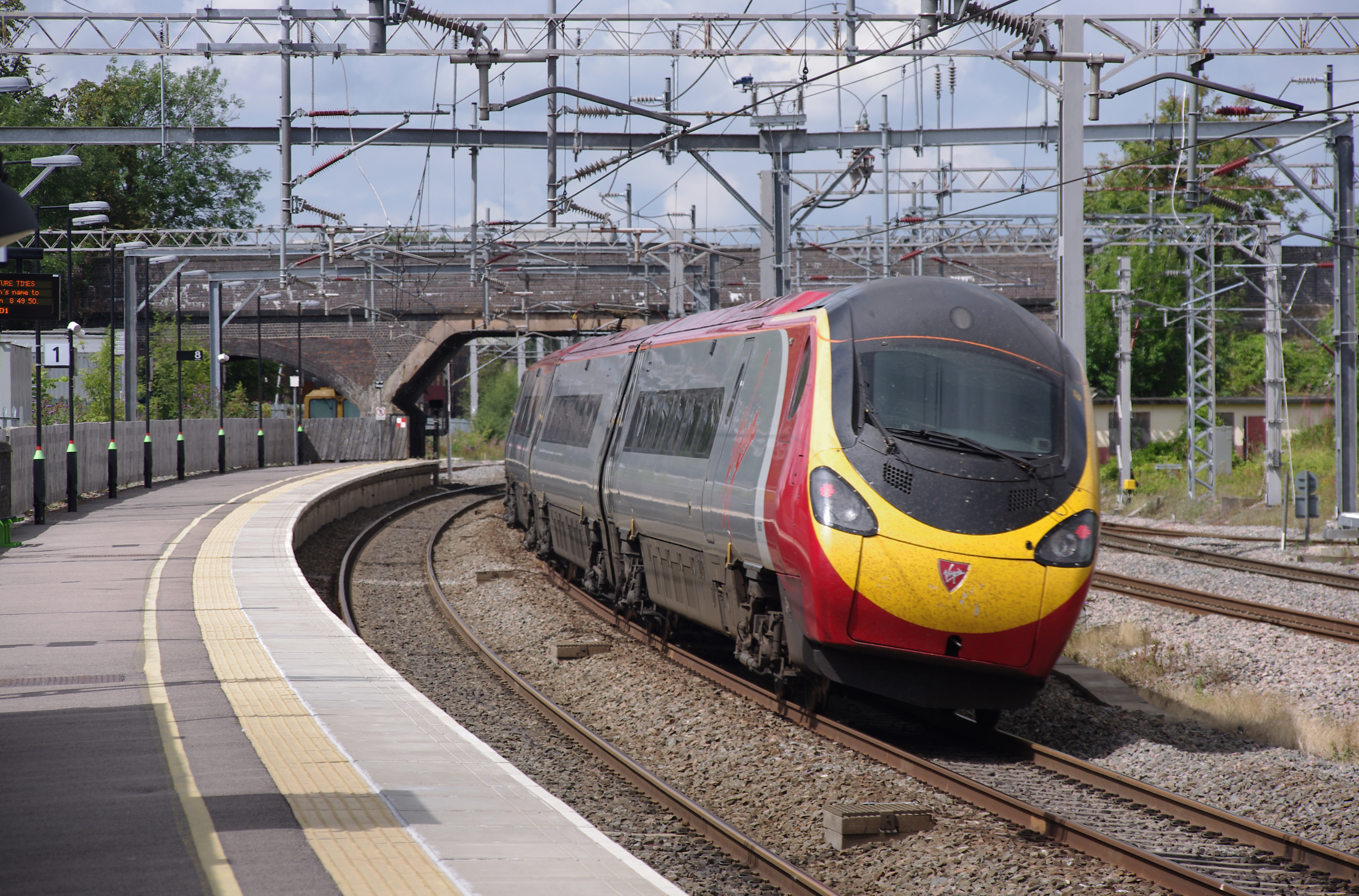
Virgin Trains West Coast Class 390 Pendolino at Lichfield in August 2011

In 1992, to keep his airline company afloat, Branson sold the Virgin label to EMI for £500 million. Branson said that he wept when the sale was completed because the record business had been the very start of the Virgin empire. He created V2 Records in 1996 to re-enter the music business, owning 5% himself. Virgin also acquired the European short-haul airline Euro Belgian Airlines and renamed it Virgin Express. In 1997 Branson took what many saw as being one of his riskier business exploits by entering into the railway business during the privatisation of British Rail. Virgin Rail Group won the InterCity CrossCountry and InterCity West Coast franchises, beginning operations in January and March 1997 respectively. Both franchises were scheduled to run for 15 years.

A series of disputes in the early 1990s caused tension between Virgin Atlantic and British Airways, which viewed Virgin as an emerging competitor. Virgin subsequently accused British Airways of poaching its passengers, hacking its computers and leaking stories to the press that portrayed Virgin negatively. After the so-called campaign of "dirty tricks", British Airways settled the case, giving £500,000 to Branson, a further £110,000 to his airline, and had to pay legal fees of up to £3 million. Branson distributed his compensation (the so-called "BA bonus") among his staff. In 1993, Branson was awarded an honorary degree of Doctor of Technology from Loughborough University.

Branson launched Virgin Mobile in 1999, and airline Virgin Blue in Australia in 2000. In the New Years Honours list he was made a Knight Bachelor for "services to entrepreneurship". He was knighted by Charles, Prince of Wales, on 30 March 2000 at an investiture in Buckingham Palace. Also in 2000, Branson received the Tony Jannus Award for his accomplishments in commercial air transportation.

=== 2001–2007: Entry into space travel and Virgin Media ===
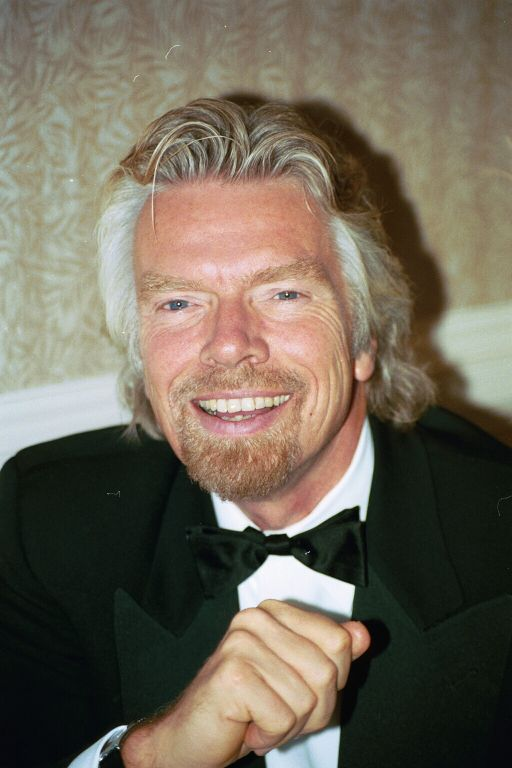
Branson in 2001

On 25 September 2004 Branson announced the signing of a deal under which a new space-tourism company, Virgin Galactic, will license the technology behind SpaceShipOne—funded by the Microsoft co-founder Paul Allen and designed by the aeronautical engineer Burt Rutan—to take paying passengers into suborbital outer space. Virgin Galactic plans to make flights available to the public with tickets priced at US$200,000 using the Scaled Composites White Knight Two. The spacecraft, SpaceShipTwo, is manufactured by The Spaceship Company, which was founded by Branson and Rutan and is now solely owned by Virgin Galactic. In 2013, Branson said that he planned to take his two children, 31-year-old Holly and 28-year-old Sam, on a trip to outer space when they ride the SpaceShipTwo rocket plane on its first public flight, then planned for 2014. As part of his promotion of the firm, Branson has added a variation of the Virgin Galactic livery to his personal business jet, the Dassault Falcon 900EX "Galactic Girl" (G-GALX).

He was ninth in The Sunday Times Rich List 2006 of the wealthiest people or families in the UK, worth slightly more than £3 billion. Branson wrote in his autobiography of the decision to start an airline.

My interest in life comes from setting myself huge, apparently unachievable challenges and trying to rise above them ... from the perspective of wanting to live life to the full, I felt that I had to attempt it.

In 2006, through a merger with SN Brussels Airlines, Virgin Airlines formed Brussels Airlines, while retaining its separate listing. It also started a national airline based in Nigeria, called Virgin Nigeria, which ceased operations in 2009. Another airline, Virgin America, began flying out of San Francisco International Airport in August 2007.

Branson's next venture with the Virgin group was Virgin Fuels, which was set up to respond to global warming and exploit the recent spike in fuel costs by offering a revolutionary, cheaper fuel for automobiles and, in the near future, aircraft. Branson has stated that he was formerly a global warming sceptic and was influenced in his decision by a breakfast meeting with Al Gore, a former vice president of the United States.

On 21 September 2006 Branson pledged to invest the profits of Virgin Atlantic and Virgin Trains in research for environmentally-friendly fuels. The investment was estimated to be worth US$3 billion.

On 4 July 2006 Branson sold his Virgin Mobile company to the British cable, television, broadband and telephone company NTL:Telewest for £900 million. A new company was launched with much fanfare and publicity on 8 February 2007, under the name Virgin Media. The decision to merge his Virgin Media Company with NTL was made in order to integrate compatible areas of the two businesses. Whilst Branson had owned three-quarters of Virgin Mobile, he would now get paid £8.5 million per annum for the use of the Virgin brand name. He does not own any part of Virgin Media.

In 2006, Branson formed Virgin Comics and Virgin Animation, an entertainment company focused on creating new stories and characters for a global audience. The company was founded with the author Deepak Chopra, the filmmaker Shekhar Kapur and the entrepreneurs Sharad Devarajan and Gotham Chopra. Branson also launched the Virgin Health Bank on 1 February 2007, offering expecting parents the opportunity to store their babies' umbilical cord blood stem cells in private and public stem-cell banks.

In June 2006, a tip-off from Virgin Atlantic led both British and American competition authorities to investigate price-fixing attempts between Virgin Atlantic and British Airways. In August 2007 British Airways was fined £271 million over the allegations. Virgin Atlantic was given immunity for tipping off the authorities and received no fine—a controversial decision the Office of Fair Trading defended as being in the public interest.

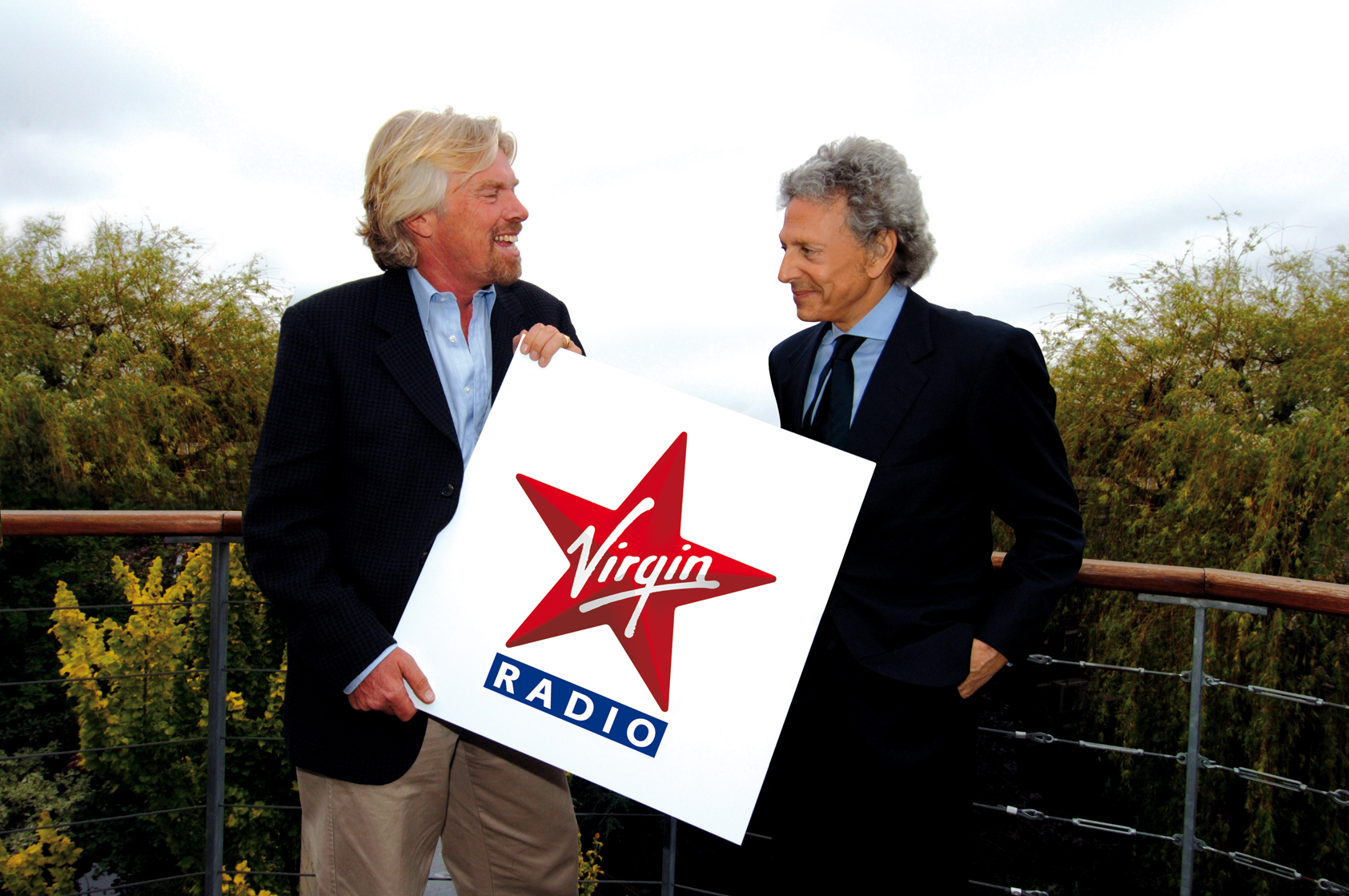
Branson with Alberto Hazan in June 2007 helping launch Virgin Radio Italia

On 9 February 2007 Branson announced the setting up of a new global science and technology prize—The Virgin Earth Challenge. The Virgin Earth Challenge was to award US$25 million to the individual or group who were able to demonstrate a commercially viable design that would result in the net removal of anthropogenic, atmospheric greenhouse gases each year for at least ten years without countervailing harmful effects.

In July 2007, Branson purchased his Australian home, Makepeace Island, in Noosa. In August 2007 he announced that he had bought a 20 per cent stake in the Malaysian airline AirAsia X.

On 13 October 2007, Branson's Virgin Group sought to add Northern Rock to its empire after submitting an offer that would result in Branson personally owning 30 per cent of the company and changing its name from Northern Rock to Virgin Money. The Daily Mail ran a campaign against his bid; Vince Cable, financial spokesperson for the Liberal Democrats, suggested in the House of Commons that Branson's criminal conviction for tax evasion might be felt by some as a good enough reason not to trust him with public money.

=== 2008–2019: Hotels, healthcare and charitable influence ===
On 9 January 2008, Virgin Healthcare announced that it would open a chain of health care clinics that would offer conventional medical care alongside homeopathic and complementary therapies, a development that was welcomed by Ben Bradshaw, the health minister.

Plans where GPs could be paid for referring National Health Service (NHS) patients to private Virgin services were abandoned in June 2008. The BMA warned the plan would "damage clinical objectivity", there would be a financial incentive for GPs to push patients toward the Virgin services at the centre. Plans to take over an NHS practice in Swindon were abandoned in late September 2008.

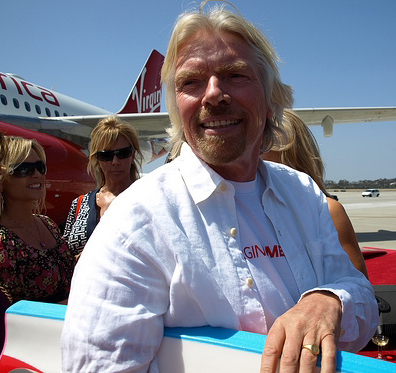
Branson in April 2009 at the launch of Virgin America in Orange County, California

In February 2009, Branson's Virgin organisation was reported as bidding to buy the former Honda Formula One team. Branson later expressed interest in Formula One, but claimed that, before the Virgin brand became involved with Honda or any other team, Formula One would have to develop a more economically efficient and environmentally responsible image. At the start of the 2009 Formula One season on 28 March, it was announced that Virgin would be sponsoring the new Brawn GP team, with discussions also under way about introducing a less "dirty" fuel in the medium term. After the end of the season and the subsequent purchase of Brawn GP by Mercedes-Benz, Branson invested in an 80 per cent buyout of Manor Grand Prix, with the team being renamed Virgin Racing.

In 2010, Virgin Hotels was launched under the Virgin Group. In February 2018, Branson announced the first Virgin hotel in the UK would open in Edinburgh.

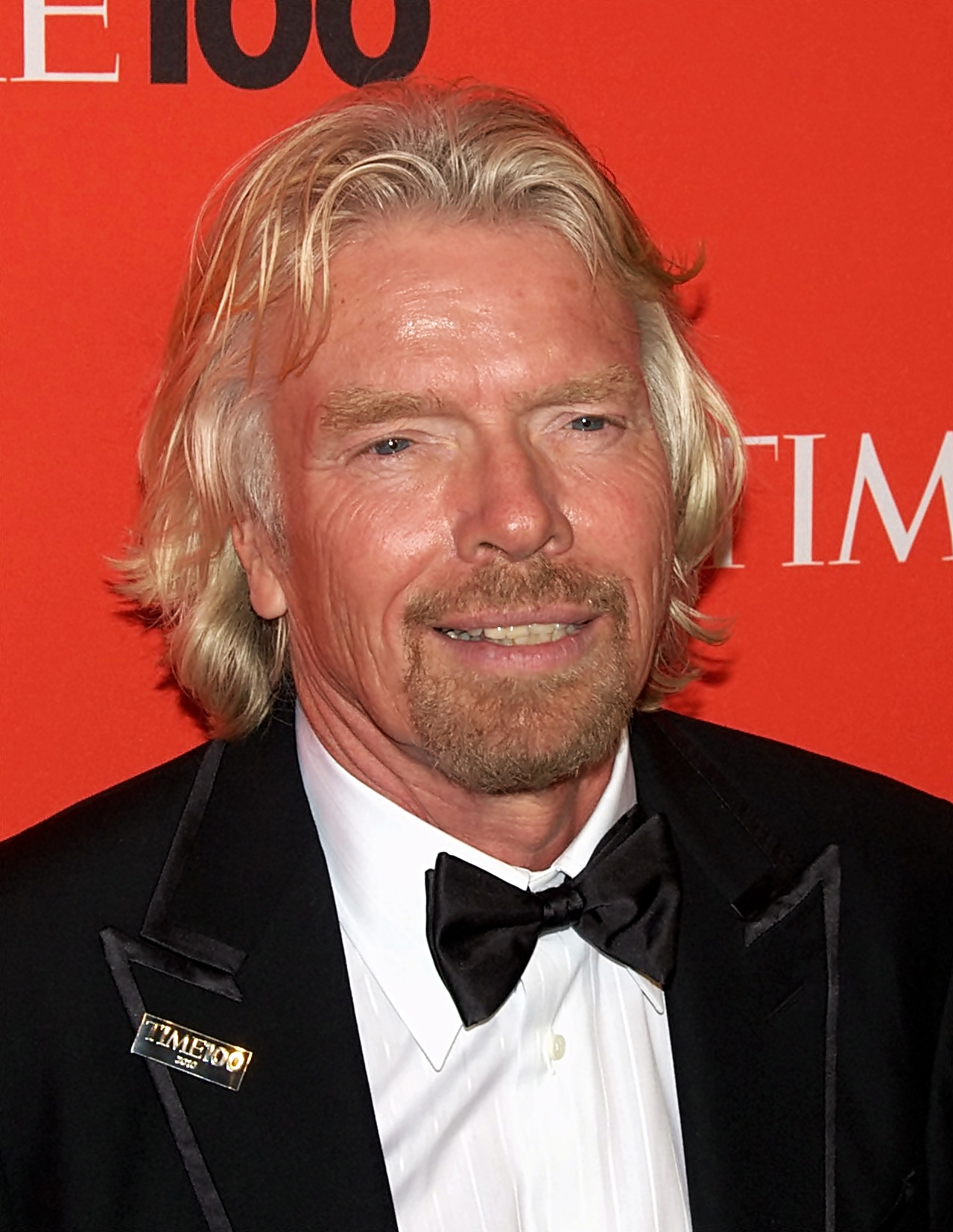
Branson at the Time 100 Gala in May 2010. Known for his informal dress code, this was a rare occasion he did not wear an open shirt.

In 2010, Branson became patron of the UK's Gordon Bennett 2010 gas balloon race, which has 16 hydrogen balloons flying across Europe.

In April 2012, Virgin Care commenced a five-year contract for provision of a range of health services which had previously been under the aegis of NHS Surrey, the local primary care trust. By March 2015 Virgin Care was in charge of more than 230 services nationwide.

In July 2012, Branson announced plans to build an orbital space launch system, designated LauncherOne.

In August 2012, when re-tendered the InterCity West Coast franchise was awarded to FirstGroup after a competitive tender process overseen by the Department for Transport. Branson had expressed his concerns about the tender process and questioned the validity of the business plan submitted by FirstGroup. When Virgin Rail lost the contract, Branson said he was convinced the civil servants had "got their maths wrong". In October, after an investigation into the bidding process, the deal was scrapped. The transport secretary, Patrick McLoughlin, announced there were "significant technical flaws" in the process and mistakes had been made by transport staff. Virgin Rail continued to operate the West Coast line until 7 December 2019, when it was replaced by Avanti West Coast.

In March 2015, Virgin Trains East Coast commenced operating the InterCity East Coast franchise; the company was a joint venture between Stagecoach (90%) and Virgin Group (10%). Due to the line performing below VTEC's expectations, it was announced in May 2018 that the contract would be terminated early by the government. VTEC ceased operating on 23 June 2018 and operations passed to a government-owned operator, London North Eastern Railway.

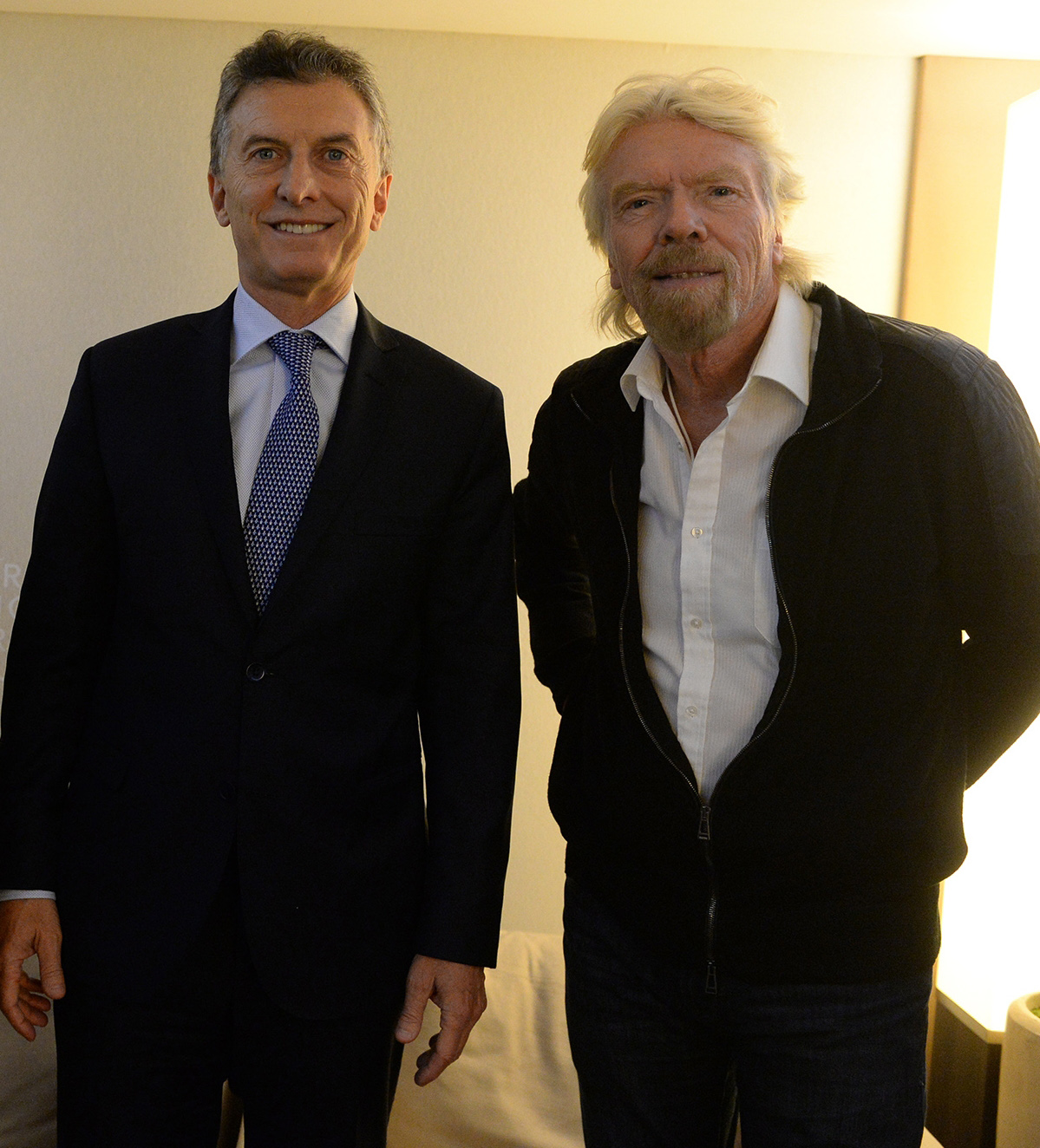
Branson and Argentina's President Mauricio Macri, 22 January 2016

In 2017, Virgin Group invested in Hyperloop One, developing a strategic partnership between the two. Branson joined the board of directors, and in December 2017 became its chairman. The announced winner of the 2017 Virgin StartUp's Foodpreneur prize was The Snaffling Pig Co, which won a six-week rental space at Intu Lakeside, the retail centre with the highest foot traffic in the United Kingdom.

In October 2017, Branson appeared on the Season 9 Premiere of Shark Tank as a guest investor, where he invested in Locker Board, a sustainable line of skateboards invented by an 11-year-old named Carson Kropfl. Branson told him that he reminded him of himself. Branson became the wealthiest Shark to have appeared on the show.

In April 2018, Branson announced the acquisition of the Las Vegas-based Hard Rock Casino-Hotel with plans to re-brand the property under his Virgin Hotels business. Virgin Hotels Las Vegas opened on 25 March 2021.

In May 2018, it was announced that he would become a partner in a private equity fund that will be co-managed by Metric Capital. The fund was to seek out consumer goods firms to invest in.

In February 2019, Branson helped to organise an international benefit concert, Venezuela Aid Live, to bring worldwide attention to the humanitarian crisis and raise funds for humanitarian aid. The concert took place on 22 February in Cúcuta, Colombia, on the Venezuelan border. On 16 October 2018, Branson received a star on the Hollywood Walk of Fame under the category of recording for co-founding Virgin Records. The Hollywood Chamber of Commerce placed his star at 6764 Hollywood Boulevard in Los Angeles.

In October 2019, Branson inaugurated Virgin's new route between London Heathrow and Tel Aviv's Ben Gurion Airport, calling Israel a land of "great entrepreneurs doing incredible things." Upon landing in Israel, he was photographed kissing the ground—a gesture traditionally performed by visitors arriving in the Holy Land.

=== 2020–present: COVID-19 difficulties ===
In March 2020, during the COVID-19 pandemic which saw a dramatic decline in international air travel of around 60 per cent globally, Branson and Virgin were criticised for asking staff to take eight weeks' unpaid leave. In response to the global pandemic, Branson put his luxury Necker Island up as collateral for a commercial loan to save Virgin Atlantic. Branson said: "Over the five decades I have been in business, this is the most challenging time we have ever faced ... From a business perspective, the damage to many is unprecedented and the length of the disruption remains worryingly unknown." On 5 May 2020 it was announced that due to the COVID-19 pandemic, the airline would lay off 3000 staff, reduce the fleet size to 35 by the summer of 2022, retire the Boeing 747-400s and would not resume operations from Gatwick Airport following the pandemic.

On 11 July 2021, Branson took a flight with Beth Moses, Sirisha Bandla and Colin Bennett to the edge of space (86 kilometres or 53 miles above Earth) on a Virgin Galactic spacecraft called VSS Unity. This made him the first billionaire founder of a space company to travel to the edge of space. The mission lasted approximately one hour, reaching a peak altitude of 53.5 miles (86.1 km). At 70 he became the third-oldest person to fly to space.

In September 2023, Branson declared his decision against injecting additional funds into Virgin Galactic, his space travel company experiencing financial losses. He highlighted that his business empire no longer possesses extensive financial resources, indicating constraints on further investment.

In October 2024, Virgin Money UK was sold to the Nationwide Building Society. Branson made £724 million from the deal, £414 million from his 14.5 per cent shareholding and £310 million for Nationwide's use of the Virgin Money brand for up to six years.

In 2025, it announced plans to compete with Eurostar on the rail lines connecting London to Paris and Brussels by 2029.

== Failed business ventures ==
Branson has been involved in a number of failed business ventures, such as Virgin Cola, Virgin Cars, Virgin Publishing, Virgin Clothing and Virgin Brides. However, Branson holds an optimistic view of failure. He has written: "I suppose the secret to bouncing back is not only to be unafraid of failures but to use them as motivational and learning tools ... There's nothing wrong with making mistakes as long as you don't make the same ones over and over again."

== World record attempts ==
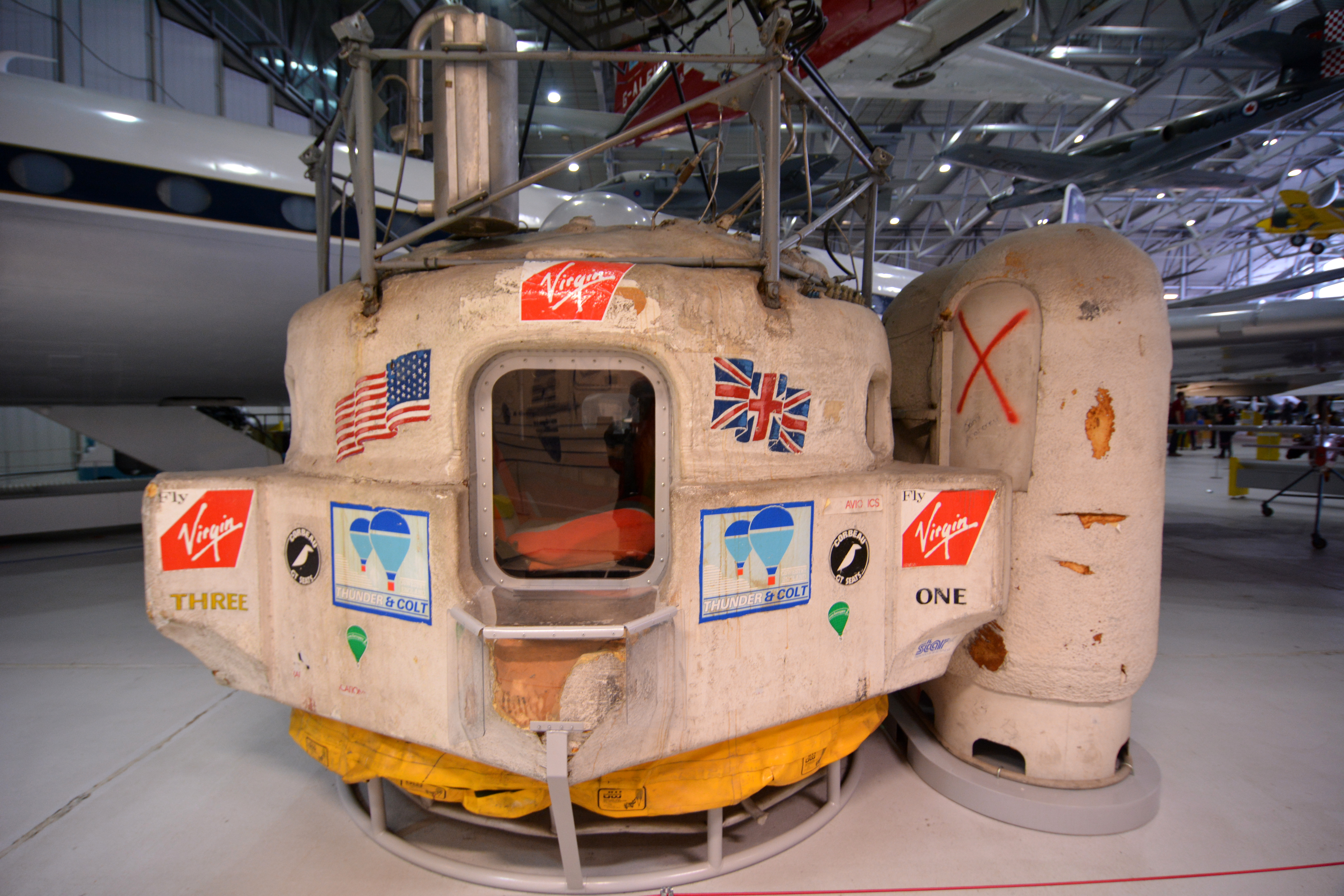
The capsule from the Virgin Atlantic Flyer balloon on display at the Imperial War Museum, Duxford, England

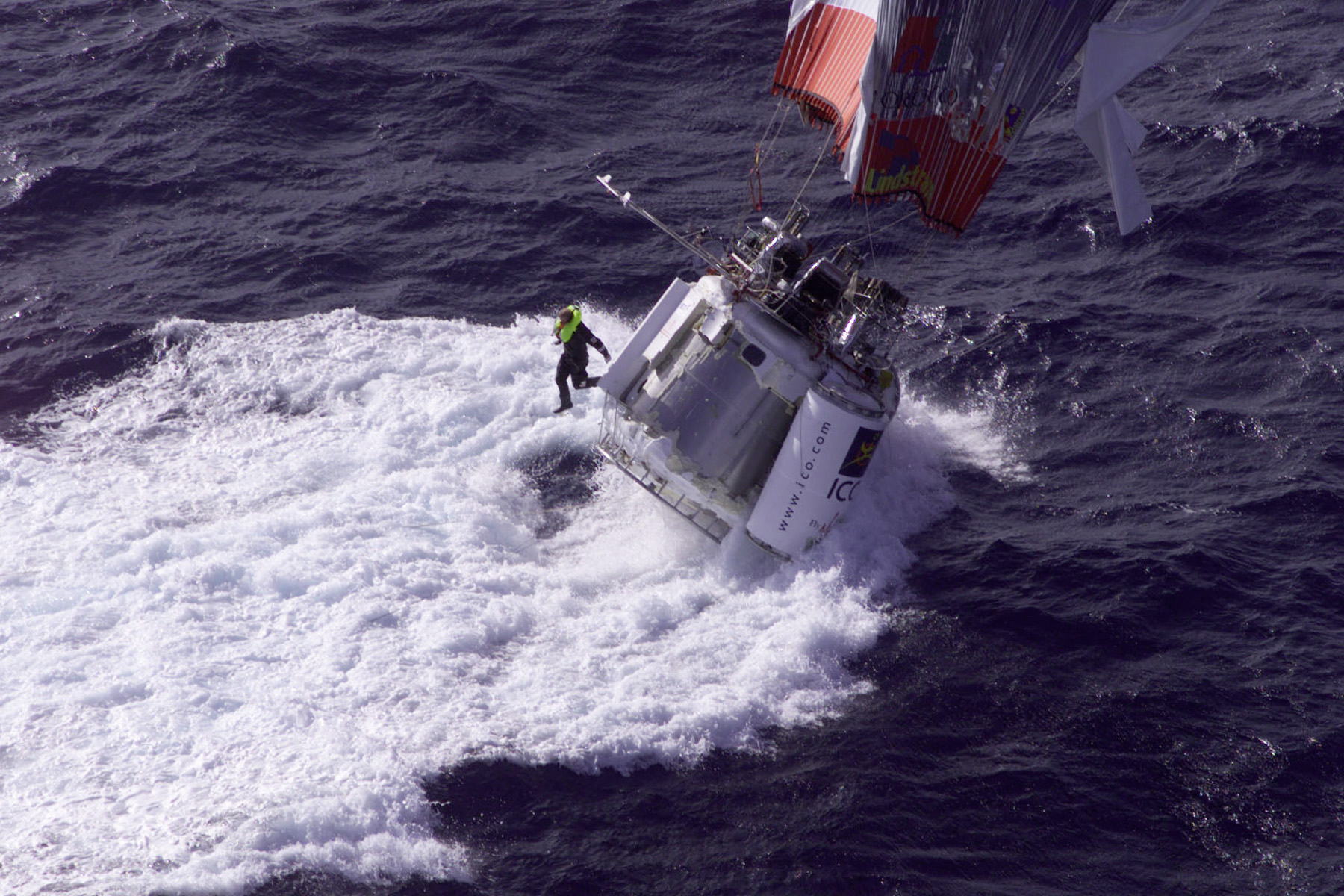
A 1998 attempt at an around-the-world balloon flight by Branson, Steve Fossett, and Per Lindstrand ends in the Pacific Ocean on 25 December 1998.

Since 1985, Branson has made several world record-breaking attempts. In the spirit of the Blue Riband, he attempted the fastest Atlantic Ocean crossing by ship. His first attempt in the Virgin Atlantic Challenger led to the boat capsizing in British waters and a rescue by Royal Navy helicopter, which received wide media coverage. Some newspapers called for Branson to reimburse the government for the rescue cost. In 1986, in his Virgin Atlantic Challenger II, he beat the record by two hours with a sailing expert named Daniel McCarthy. In 1987, his hot air balloon Virgin Atlantic Flyer crossed the Atlantic.

In January 1991, Branson crossed the Pacific from Japan to Arctic Canada, 6,700 miles (10,800 km), in a balloon of 2,600,000 cubic feet (74,000 m^{3}). This broke the record, with a speed of 145 miles per hour (233 km/h).

Between 1995 and 1998, Branson, Per Lindstrand, Vladimir Dzhanibekov, Larry Newman and Steve Fossett made attempts to circumnavigate the globe by balloon. In late 1998 they made a record-breaking flight from Morocco to Hawaii, but were unable to complete a global flight before Bertrand Piccard and Brian Jones in Breitling Orbiter 3 in March 1999.

In March 2004, Branson set a record by travelling from Dover to Calais in a Gibbs Aquada in 1 hour, 40 minutes and 6 seconds, the fastest crossing of the English Channel in an amphibious vehicle. The previous record of six hours was set by two Frenchmen. The hosts of the motoring television programme Top Gear, Jeremy Clarkson, James May and Richard Hammond, attempted to break this record in 2007 with an amphibious vehicle which they had constructed and, while successfully crossing the channel, did not break Branson's record.

In September 2008, Branson and his children made an unsuccessful attempt at an eastbound record crossing of the Atlantic Ocean under sail in the 99-foot (30 m) sloop Virgin Money. The boat, also known as Speedboat, is owned by a New York Yacht Club member named Alex Jackson, who was a co-skipper on this passage, with Branson and Mike Sanderson. After two days, four hours, winds of force 7 to 9 (strong gale), and seas of 40 feet (12 m), a 'monster wave' destroyed the spinnaker, washed a ten-man life raft overboard and severely ripped the mainsail. The sloop eventually continued to St. George's, Bermuda.

== Television, film and print ==
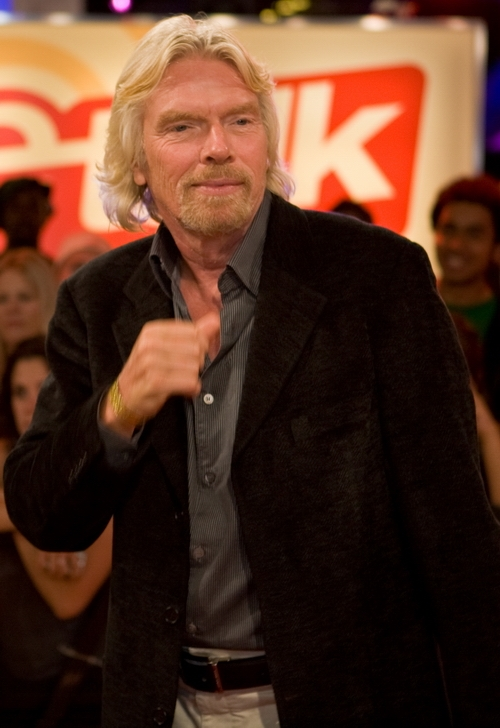
Branson at the 2008 Toronto International Film Festival

Branson has guest starred, usually playing himself, on several television shows, including Friends, Baywatch, Birds of a Feather, Only Fools and Horses, The Day Today, a special episode of the comedy Goodness Gracious Me and Tripping Over. Branson made several appearances during the 1990s on the BBC Saturday morning programme Live & Kicking, where he was referred to as 'the pickle man' by the comedy act Trev and Simon (in reference to Branston Pickle).

Branson also appears in a cameo early in XTC's "Generals and Majors" video. He was also the star of a reality television show on Fox called The Rebel Billionaire: Branson's Quest for the Best (2004), in which sixteen contestants were tested for their entrepreneurship and sense of adventure. It lasted for one season.

His high public profile often leaves him open as a figure of satire—the 2000 AD series Zenith features a parody of Branson as a supervillain, as the comic's publisher and favoured distributor and the Virgin group were in competition at the time. He is also caricatured in The Simpsons episode "Monty Can't Buy Me Love" as the tycoon Arthur Fortune, as the ballooning megalomaniac Richard Chutney (a pun on Branson, as in Branston Pickle) in Believe Nothing, and voiced himself in "The Princess Guide". The character Grandson Richard 39 in Terry Pratchett's Wings is modelled on Branson.

He has a cameo appearance in several films: Around the World in 80 Days (2004), where he played a hot-air balloon operator, and Superman Returns (2006), where he was credited as a 'Shuttle Engineer' and appeared alongside his son, Sam, with a Virgin Galactic-style commercial suborbital shuttle at the centre of his storyline. He also has a cameo in the James Bond film Casino Royale (2006). Here, he is seen as a passenger going through Miami Airport security check-in and being frisked – several Virgin Atlantic planes appear soon after. British Airways edited out Branson's cameo in their in-flight screening of the movie. He makes a number of brief and disjointed appearances in the documentary Derek and Clive Get the Horn (1979), which follows the exploits of Peter Cook and Dudley Moore recording their final comedy album.

Branson is a Star Trek fan and named the spaceplane VSS Enterprise in honour of the Star Trek spaceships, and in 2006 reportedly offered the actor William Shatner a ride on the inaugural space launch of Virgin Galactic. In an interview in Time magazine, published on 10 August 2009, Shatner claimed Branson approached him asking how much he would pay for a journey on the spaceplane. In response, Shatner asked "how much would you pay me to do it?"

== Humanitarian initiatives ==
In the late 1990s, Branson and the musician Peter Gabriel discussed with Nelson Mandela their idea of a small group of leaders working to solve difficult global conflicts. On 18 July 2007 in Johannesburg, South Africa, Mandela announced the formation of a new group, The Elders. Kofi Annan served as Chair of The Elders and Gro Harlem Brundtland as deputy chair. The Elders is funded by a group of donors, including Branson and Gabriel. Branson's work in South Africa also includes the Branson School of Entrepreneurship, set up in 2005 as a partnership between Virgin Unite, the non-profit foundation of Virgin, and entrepreneur Taddy Blecher, the founder of CIDA City Campus, a university in Johannesburg. The school aims to improve economic growth in South Africa by supporting start-ups and micro-enterprises with skills, mentors, services, networks and finance arrangements. In 2010, he and the Nduna Foundation (founded by Amy Robbins), and Humanity United (an organization backed by Pam Omidyar, the wife of the eBay founder Pierre Omidyar) founded Enterprise Zimbabwe.

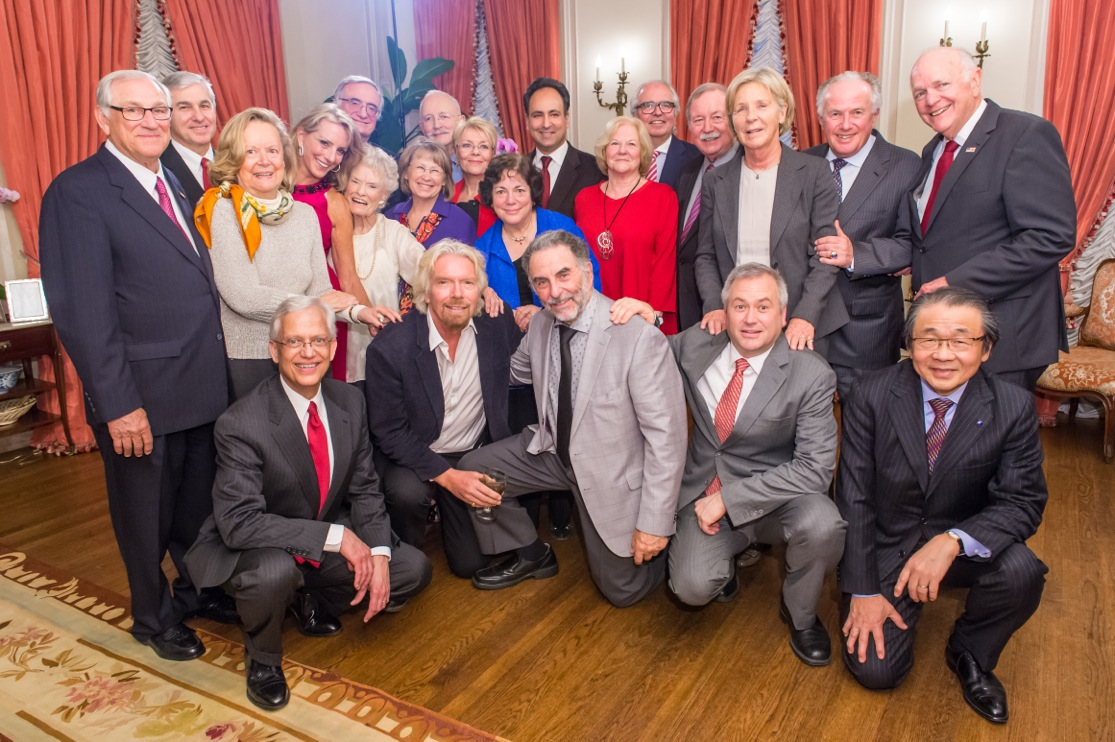
Richard Branson with his mother Eve, and the board of directors of the International Centre for Missing & Exploited Children, April 2014

In 1999, Branson became a founding sponsor of the International Centre for Missing & Exploited Children ("ICMEC"), the goal of which is to help find missing children, and to stop the exploitation of children, as his mother Eve became a founding member of ICMEC's board of directors.

He also launched Virgin Startup, an official delivery partner for the UK's Start Up Loans programme. Through this new organisation, he provided loans to entrepreneurs between the ages of 18 and 30 UK-wide. A pilot of the scheme, which ran over 11 months, injected £600,000 into 100 businesses.

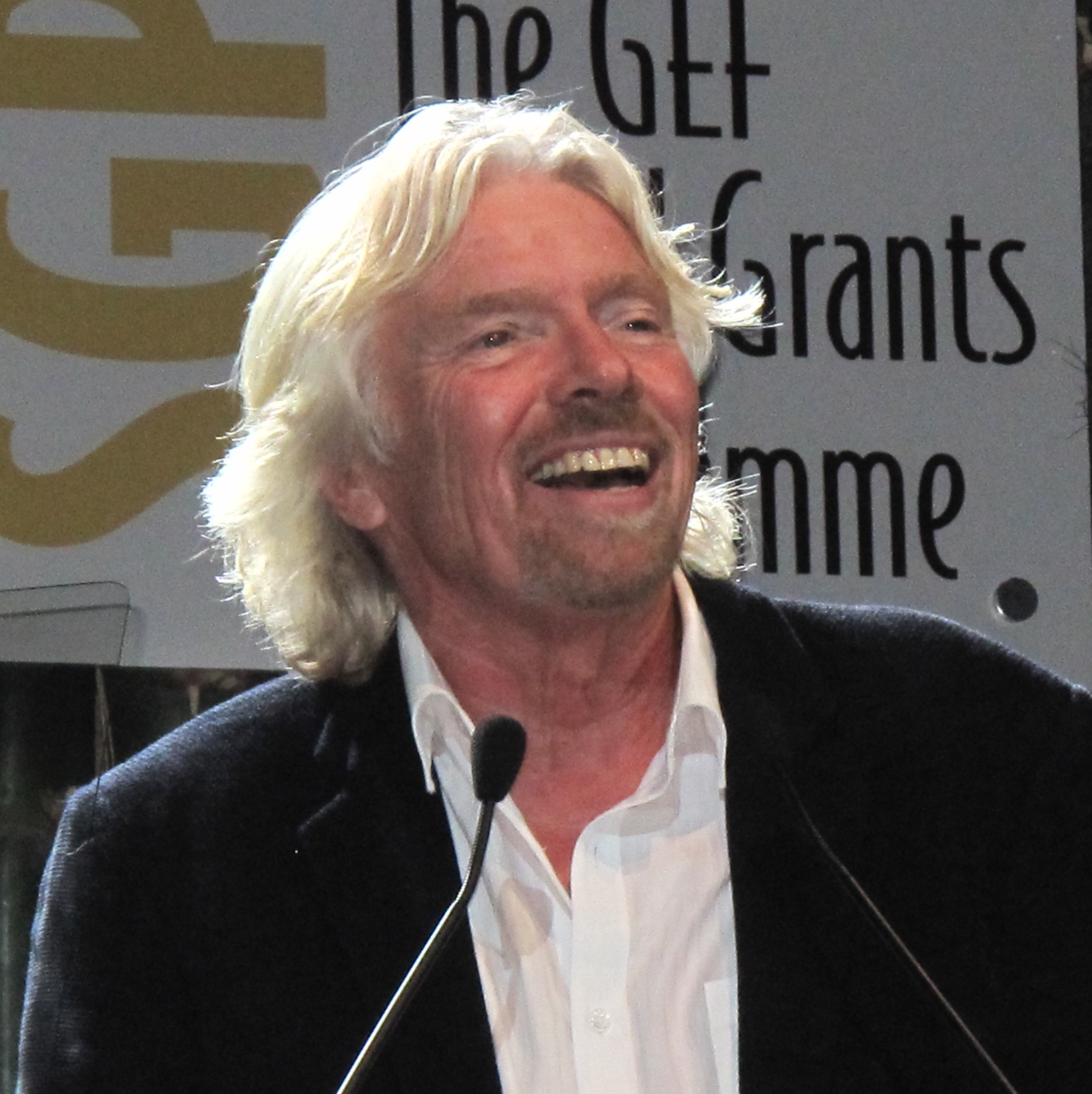
Branson at the United Nations Conference on Sustainable Development in 2012

Branson is a signatory of Global Zero campaign, a non-profit international initiative for the elimination of all nuclear weapons worldwide. Since its launch in Paris in December 2008, Global Zero has grown to 300 leaders, including current and former heads of state, national security officials and military commanders, and 400,000 citizens worldwide; developed a practical step-by-step plan to eliminate nuclear weapons; launched an international student campaign with 75 campus chapters in eight countries; and produced a documentary film, Countdown to Zero, in partnership with Lawrence Bender and Participant Media.

In October 2018, Branson spoke out for Jamal Khashoggi, a Saudi journalist who was killed by Saudi authorities in the Saudi consulate in Istanbul, Turkey, by suspending his advisory role from Saudi Arabia's biggest Red Sea tourism project. He issued a statement saying, "The disappearance of journalist Jamal Khashoggi, if proved true, would clearly change the ability of any of us in the West to do business with the Saudi Government."

=== Climate change pledge ===
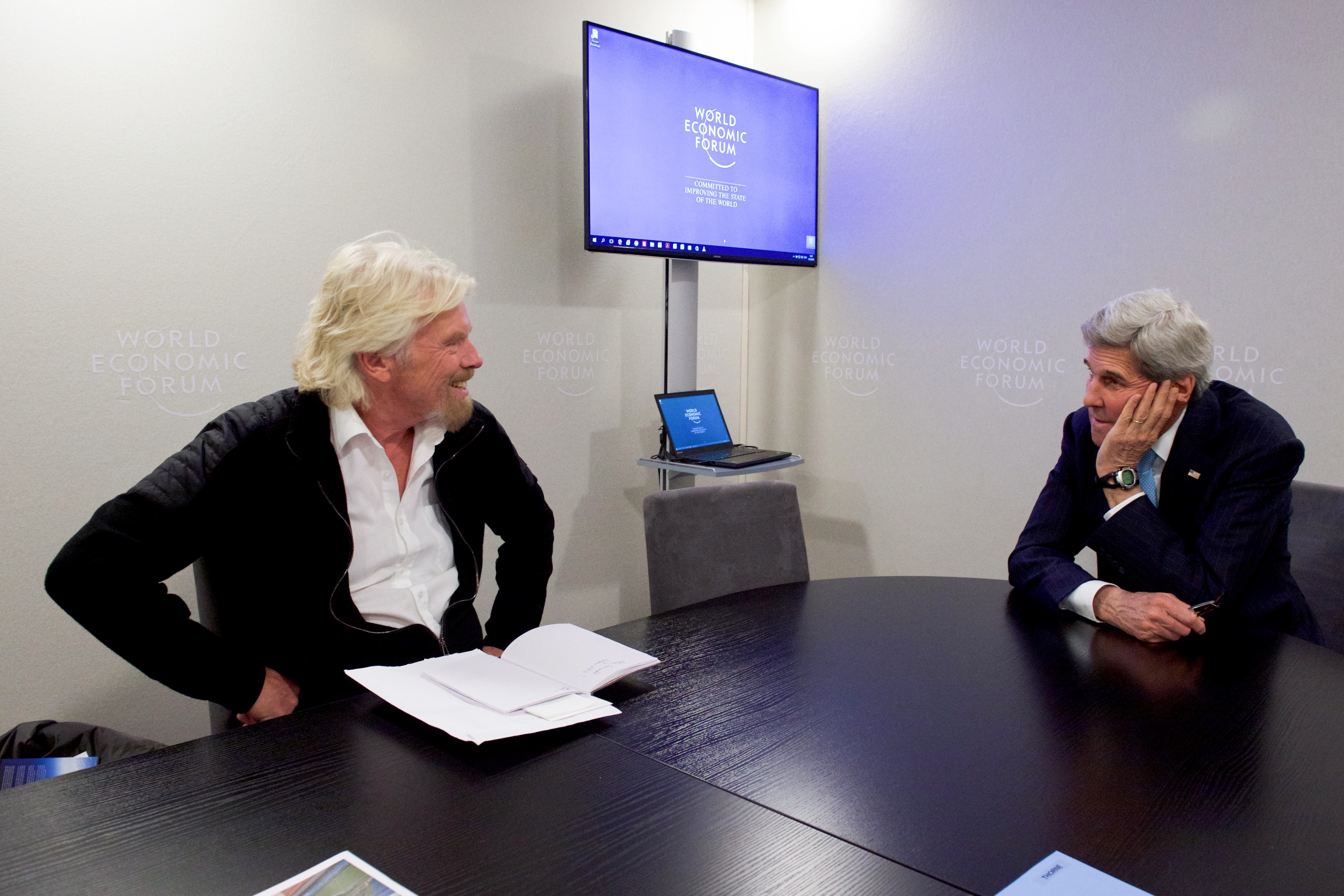
Branson discusses climate change with the United States Secretary of State John Kerry in 2016.

In 2006 Branson made a high-profile pledge to invest US$3 billion towards addressing global warming over the course of the following decade. However, the author and activist Naomi Klein has criticised Branson for contributing "well under $300 million" as of 2014, far below the originally stated goal. Additionally, Klein says Virgin airlines' greenhouse gas emissions increased considerably in the years following his pledge.

=== B Team ===
Branson is the co-founder of the B Team, a global nonprofit organization that was founded in 2013 by a group of business leaders who are committed to using their influence to drive positive change and promote sustainable business practice. The B Team has several focus areas, including climate action, human rights and responsible tax practices. The organisation also advocates for gender equality and diversity and inclusion in the workplace, recognising that these issues are critical to achieving sustainable business practices.

== Politics ==
In the 1980s, Branson was briefly given the post of "litter Tsar" by Margaret Thatcher—charged with "keeping Britain tidy". During the BBC coverage of the 1997 general election, Branson was interviewed at the Labour Party celebrations at the Royal Festival Hall. In 2005 he declared that there were only negligible differences between the two main parties on economic matters. He was suggested as a candidate for Mayor of London before the first 2000 mayoral election, with polls indicating he would be a viable candidate, but he did not express interest.

In March 2015, Branson said that almost all drug use should be decriminalised in the UK, following the example of Portugal.

Branson supported continuing British membership of the European Union and was opposed to the 2016 referendum. On 28 June 2016, interviewed for ITV's Good Morning Britain, he said his company had lost a third of its value as a result of the referendum result and that a planned venture, employing more than 3,000 people, which he had announced before the referendum, had been shelved. He gave his backing for a second referendum. Branson endorsed Hillary Clinton in the 2016 United States presidential election.

Branson openly criticised the Philippine drug war marred by allegations of extrajudicial killings. In September 2016, he, along with the former United Nations High Commissioner for Human Rights Louise Arbour and the former Brazilian president Fernando Henrique Cardoso, wrote a letter to the then Philippine president, Rodrigo Duterte, calling on his government to halt the killings and develop evidence-based policies to address the Philippines' drug situation.

Branson is an opponent of the death penalty, stating: "the death penalty is always cruel, barbaric and inhumane. It has no place in the world." In 2015 Branson released a letter in support of the American prisoner Richard Glossip on the day he was due to be executed, and in 2021 was among the public figures who called on Singapore to halt the execution of Nagaenthran K. Dharmalingam, a Malaysian drug trafficker who was convicted and sentenced to Singapore's death row for heroin trafficking. After Nagaenthran was executed by hanging at Changi Prison, Branson expressed disappointment in Singapore for its "relentless machinery of death" since it left "no room for decency, dignity, compassion, or mercy". In October 2022 the Singapore Ministry of Home Affairs invited Branson to Singapore for a live televised debate on Singapore's approach towards drugs and the death penalty with K. Shanmugam, Singapore's Minister for Home Affairs and Law. Branson rejected the offer. In 2023, Branson once again spoke up against Singapore's stance of capital punishment when he protested against the upcoming execution of Tangaraju Suppiah, a 46-year-old Singaporean who was found guilty of trafficking 1 kg of cannabis and scheduled to hang on 26 April 2023, and Branson claimed that Tangaraju was "innocent" of the crime of which he was convicted. Before the execution of Saridewi Djamani on 28 July 2023, Branson also appealed for mercy on Saridewi's behalf.

== Tax non-compliance ==
In 1971, Branson was convicted for tax evasion and was briefly jailed, for one night, having fraudulently obtained export documents for records to be sold on the domestic market to avoid paying Purchase Tax. Customs officials caught onto the scheme and executed a sting operation, marking records bought for the international market with invisible ink and subsequently buying them on the domestic market. Branson was advised of the sting by an anonymous tip-off and attempted to dispose of the evidence, but this was unsuccessful.

Branson's business empire is owned by a complicated series of offshore trusts and companies. The Sunday Times stated that his wealth is calculated at £3 billion; if he were to retire to his Caribbean island and liquidate all of this, he would pay relatively little in tax. Branson has been criticised for his business strategy, and has been accused of being a carpetbagger. Branson responded that he is living on Necker for health rather than tax reasons.

In 2013, Branson described himself as a "tax exile", having saved millions in tax by ending his mainland British residency and living in the British Virgin Islands. This was echoed by then-Shadow Chancellor of the Exchequer, John McDonnell, in 2016, amid calls for his knighthood to be revoked.

== Personal life ==
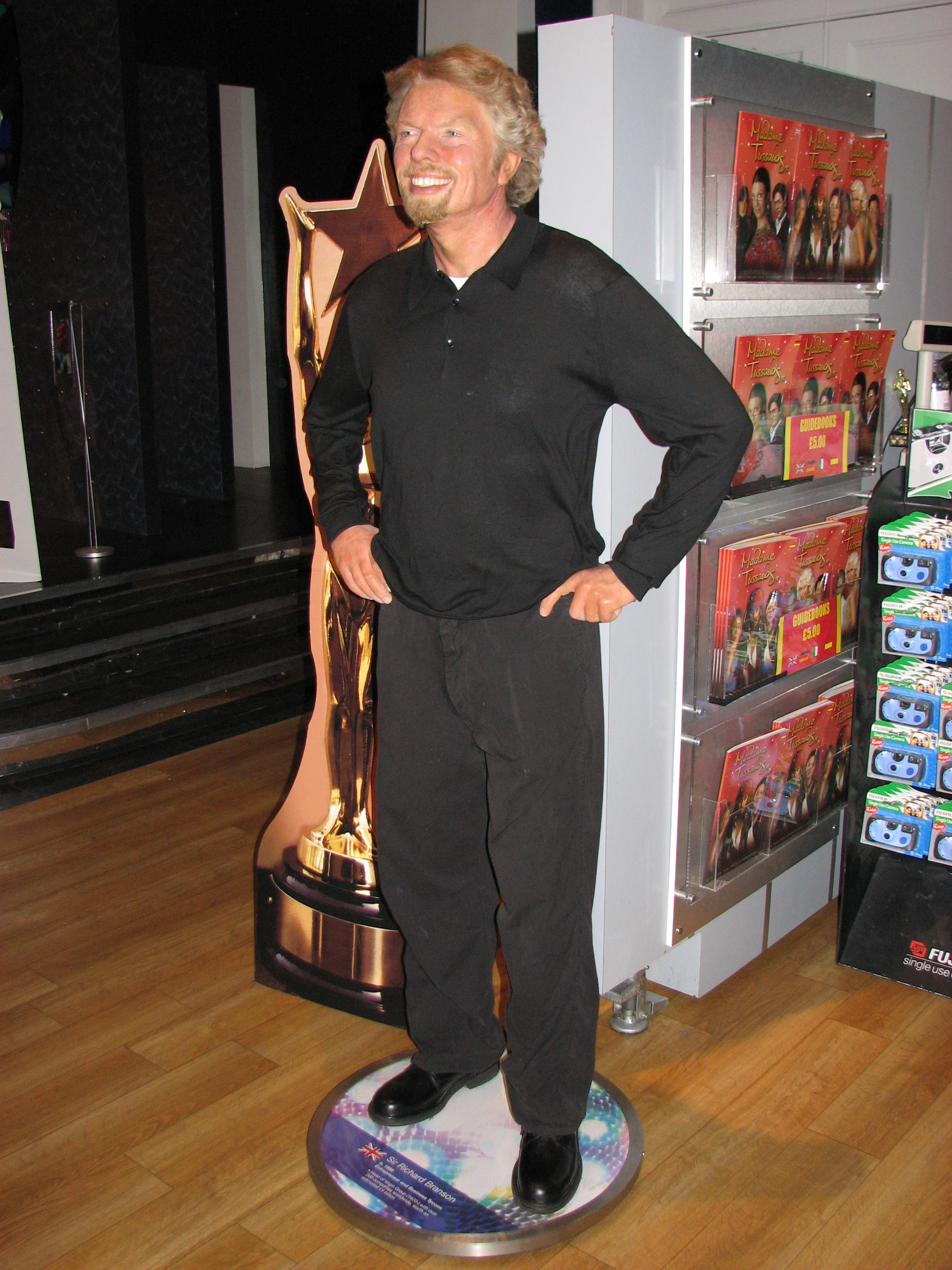
Waxwork of Branson at Madame Tussauds, London

In 1972, Branson married Kristen Tomassi. In 1974, they went to Cozumel and hired a deep-sea boat. Two miles out, "We stripped off to our underwear and the fisherman gave us a plank of wood from the bottom of the boat" and swam to shore. In 1979, they divorced. They had no children together.

In 1976, Branson met Joan Templeman and later began a relationship with her. Three children were born before their marriage on Necker Island in 1989; a daughter, who lived for four days, another daughter, and a son. On 25 November 2025, Branson announced Joan's death at the age of 80 on Instagram, stating he was "heartbroken".

Branson was friends with child sex offender Jeffrey Epstein, and was revealed in January 2026 to have emailed Epstein in 2013 that he "would love to see you. As long as you bring your harem!" It was also revealed that Branson had given PR advice to Epstein to publicly downplay his conviction of soliciting a minor for prostitution by telling Epstein that "I think if Bill Gates was willing to say that you’ve been a brilliant adviser to him, that you slipped up many years ago by sleeping with a 17½-year-old woman … and have done nothing that's against the law since, and yes, as a single man you seem to have a penchant for women. But there's nothing wrong with that."

In November 2017, Antonia Jenae, a backing singer for Joss Stone, alleged that Branson sexually assaulted her at Necker Island by "putting his head between her cleavage and making boat engine noises", a practice that is known as motorboating. A spokesperson for Branson confirmed to The Sun that members of the band had been invited for a party on the island in 2010, but that he and friends and family in attendance had "no recollection" of the events and that "there would never have been any intention to offend or make anyone feel uncomfortable. Richard apologises if anyone felt that way."

Branson is an experienced kitesurfer, and has set two world records in the sport. The first was as the oldest person to kitesurf across the English Channel. Then in 2014, he broke the Guinness World Record for most people riding a surfboard by kiting with three women attached to him, including the professional kiteboarder Susi Mai and the entrepreneur Alison Di Spaltro. Also an avid cyclist, in August 2016, he was injured while riding his bicycle in the British Virgin Islands, resulting in torn ligaments and a cracked cheek.

In 2017, Branson's Necker Island home was left uninhabitable after Hurricane Irma. It was the second time it had been severely damaged, after the building caught fire when it was struck by lightning caused by Hurricane Irene in 2011. Branson's mother, Eve, died of COVID-19 complications in January 2021 at the age of 96. Branson posted an online celebration of her life.

In 2007, Branson was ordained as a minister by the Universal Life Church Monastery to conduct an on-flight wedding as part of a marketing effort for domestic flights in the US on Virgin America airline. From 2013 to 2017, he served as president of the Old Stoic Society of Stowe School.

Branson has said in a number of interviews that he has been much influenced by non-fiction books. He most commonly mentions Nelson Mandela's autobiography, Long Walk to Freedom, stating that Mandela was "one of the most inspiring men I have ever met and had the honour to call my friend." Owing to his interest in humanitarian and ecological issues, Branson also lists Al Gore's best-selling book, An Inconvenient Truth, and The Revenge of Gaia by James Lovelock among his favourites. According to Branson's book, Screw It, Let's Do It: Lessons in Life, he is also a fan of Jung Chang's Wild Swans and Antony Beevor's Stalingrad. In fiction, Branson has long admired Peter Pan, and in 2006 he founded Virgin Comics LLC, stating that Virgin Comics will give "a whole generation of young, creative thinkers a voice".

Branson is an atheist. He said in an interview in 2011 with Piers Morgan that evolution is a demonstrable fact and he believes in the importance of humanitarian efforts, not in the existence of God: "I would love to believe", he said. "It's very comforting to believe".

== Bibliography ==
- Losing My Virginity: How I've Survived, Had Fun, and Made a Fortune Doing Business My Way. National Geographic Books. 9 March 2010. ISBN 978-0-7535-1955-4.
- Screw It, Let's Do It. Virgin Books. 2006. ISBN 978-0-7535-1149-7.
- Let's Not Screw It, Let's Just Do it: New Lessons for the Future. Random House Australia. 2007. ISBN 978-1-7416-6688-5.
- Business Stripped Bare. Virgin Books. 2008. ISBN 978-0-7535-1503-7.
- Arctic Diary: Surviving on Thin Ice. Virgin Books. 2008. ISBN 978-0-7535-1536-5.
- Reach for the Skies: Ballooning, Birdmen and Blasting into Space. Virgin Books. 2010. ISBN 978-1-905264-91-9.
- Globalisation Laid Bare: Lessons in International Business. Gibson Square Books. 2010. ISBN 978-1-90614-272-8.
- Screw Business as Usual. Portfolio/Penguin. 2011. ISBN 978-1-59184-434-1.
- Like a Virgin: Secrets They Won't Teach You at Business School. Virgin Books. 2013. ISBN 978-0-75351-992-9.
- The Virgin Way: How to Listen, Learn, Laugh and Lead. Virgin Books. 2014. ISBN 978-1-90526-490-2.
- Finding My Virginity. Ebury Publishing. 2017. ISBN 978-0-75355-108-0.
  - Also published as: The Virgin Way: If It's Not Fun, It's Not Worth Doing and The Virgin Way: Everything I Know About Leadership

== Audiobook ==
- Losing and Finding My Virginity: The Full Story. Virgin Digital. 4 April 2024. ISBN 978-0-7535-6110-2.
