= Madeline Weinrib =

American textile artist

Madeline Weinrib (born August 25, 1956) is an American textile and carpet designer and visual artist.

== Life and career ==
Weinrib attended Marymount College in New York. She taught drawing at the City University of New York during the 1990s.

Weinrib has created work for the Metropolitan Museum of Art store including as part of "The Heirloom Project" (of which she was the creative director), that the museum store commissioned from her and other artisans and bespoke boutique firms in countries including Turkey, Morocco, and India which she curated in celebration of the tenth anniversary (which turned out to be the eleventh due to the covid 19 pandemic shutdown) of their "reimagined Islamic wing". Subsequently, Weinrib also spearheaded and produced another "Heirloom Project" pop-up for the Museum of Fine Arts, Houston.

She and the art critic and poet Rene Ricard (1946–2014) designed five rugs together and a few years after his death at 67, the finally realized works were shown at the Emma Scully gallery on the Upper East Side of Manhattan. Weinrib's work has been described as "timeless and contemporary".

Another of Weinrib's prominent projects was the designing of carpets for the Brooklyn Academy of Music Opera House.

In 2018 Weinrib collaborated with the Manolo Blahnik shoe line which released four different models featuring her fabrics. She is also a regular design and product contributor to the Neue Galerie's design store.

In 2018 Weinrib became a co-owner of the El Fenn Hotel in Marakech, with Vanessa Branson and Graham Head. Weinrib also notably designed two lines for the hotel shop, firstly Moroccan caftans. and the second couture editions of clothing made Weinrib made together in Marrakesh with artisans. books, baskets, leathergoods, Fes ceramics, kilim throws, jewelry, and other Moroccan fine crafts. . In 2024 the British luxury clothier N.Peal presented a collection inspired by El Fenn, including works displayed at the hotel from both Weinrib and Vanessa branson's private art collections.

Curated exhibitions of Weinrib's creation have been held at the Alberto Levi Gallery in Milan, Sebastian Barquet in New York and Ralph Pucci International, among various other venues,

== Personal life ==
She is the granddaughter of Max Weinrib the founder of ABC Home and Carpet.

She is married to executive Graham Head who is the foremer bice chsirmsn of ABC Home & Carpet snd a trustee of the Turquoise Mountain Foundation, which was founded by King Charles 3 (then his HRH The Prince of Wales) and the Afhan President Hamid Karzai. Weinrib and Head also worked together professionally as co-owners and curators 9f design and collections at thr El Fenn boutique hotel in Marakech.

== Awards ==
In 2014 at HC&G Innovation in Design Awards at the Guild Hall of East Hampton in East Hampton, New York, Weinrib was presented with 2014 HC&G Innovator Award from "Hamptons Cottages & Gardens" Magazine.
