= Precision Cellular Storage =

Qatari-British company providing storage for cord-blood stem-cells

- Company type: Private (Limited liability)
- Founded: 2009
- Headquarters: Doha, Qatar; Reading, United Kingdom
- Key people: Dr Hadi Abderrahim, chair; Dr Danny Ramadan; Prof. Alex Knuth
- Products: Cord blood banking
- Owner: Qatar Foundation
- Website: www.precisioncellularstorage.com

Precision Cellular Storage is a private company providing storage facilities for stem cells obtained from cord blood. It operates in Doha and the United Kingdom. The company was named Virgin Health Bank until 2018, when it closed to new business and focused on the storage of existing customers' units.

== History ==
The company was established in 2007 by the Virgin Group to combine storage services with educational initiatives for families and the medical community.

Cord blood banking enables stem cells to be collected from the blood remaining in a baby's umbilical cord and then cryo-preserved so that they can be used in therapies should the child or other matched recipients require them.

Virgin Health Bank was established to fulfil three key purposes:

1. To provide families with access to transplant quality cord blood stem cell banking services.
2. To provide families with access to honest and accurate information about cord blood banking, empowering them to make truly informed choices about storing their baby's stem cells.
3. To develop awareness and understanding of cord blood banking amongst both the general population and the medical communities.

The company operates in the United Kingdom and in the State of Qatar.
