= Eve Branson =

British philanthropist (1924–2021)

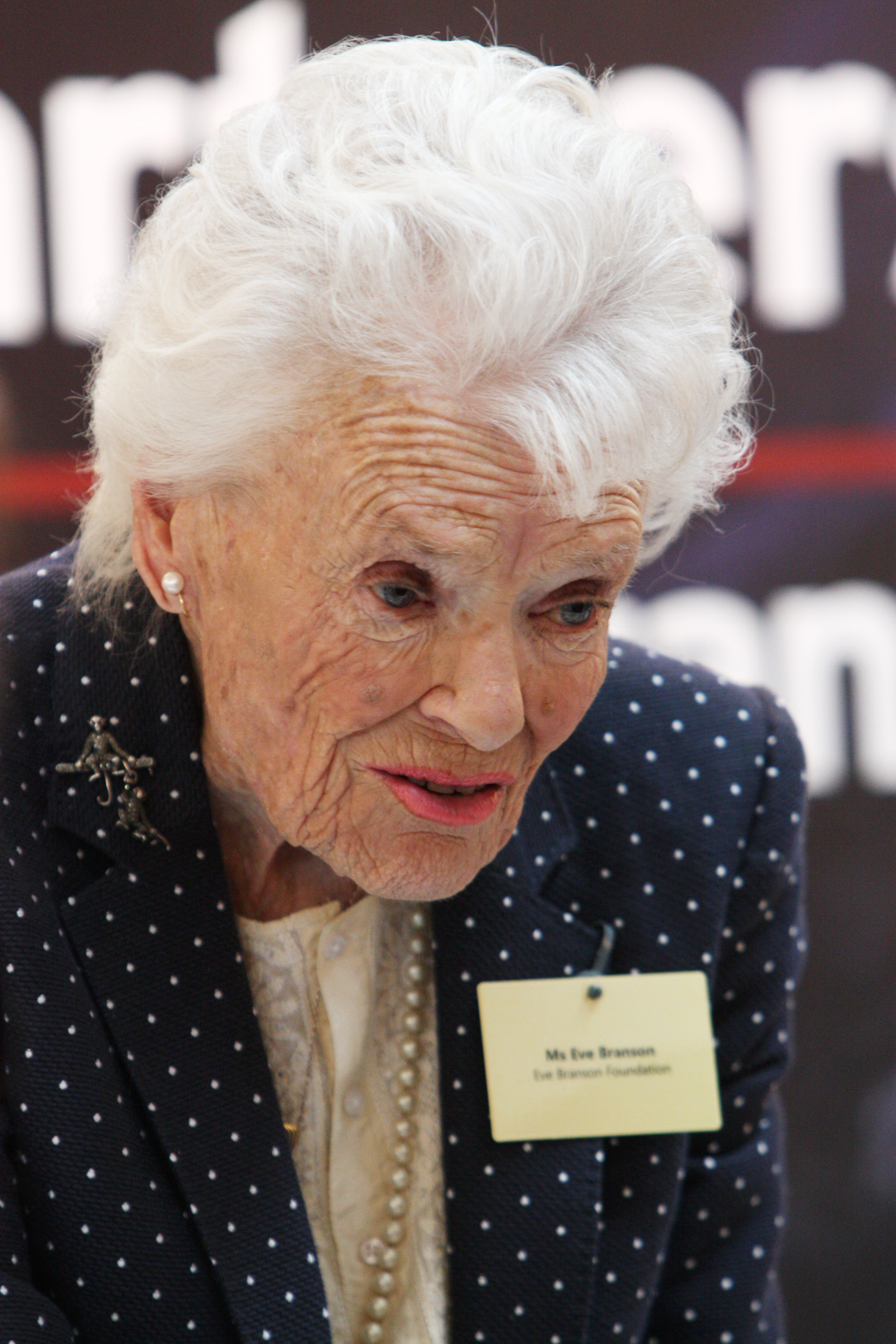
- Branson in 2013
- Born: Evette Huntley Flindt; 12 July 1924; Edmonton, Middlesex, England
- Died: 8 January 2021 (aged 96); United Kingdom
- Occupations: Founder and director of the Eve Branson Foundation; Philanthropist; Child welfare advocate
- Board member of: International Centre for Missing & Exploited Children
- Spouse: Ted Branson (m. 1949; died 2011)
- Children: 3, including Richard and Vanessa
- Website: evebransonfoundation.org.uk

Evette Huntley Branson (née Flindt; 12 July 1924 – 8 January 2021) was a British philanthropist, child welfare advocate, and the mother of Richard Branson.

== Life and career ==
Branson was born in Edmonton, Middlesex (now London Borough of Enfield, Greater London), England, the daughter of Dorothy Constance (née Jenkins) (19 June 1898 – August 1997) and Major Rupert Ernest Huntley Flindt (born 11 St Faith's Road, West Norwood, 28 December 1890 – 19 October 1966). As a young adult, she served in the Women's Royal Naval Service ("Wrens") during World War II. After the war ended, she toured West Germany as a ballet dancer with Entertainments National Service Association (ENSA). She later became an airline hostess for British South American Airways. After marrying, Branson ran a real estate property business and was a military police officer and probation officer. She also wrote novels and children's books.

Branson established the Eve Branson Foundation and served as its director. In 2013 she published her autobiography, Mum's the Word: The High-Flying Adventures of Eve Branson.

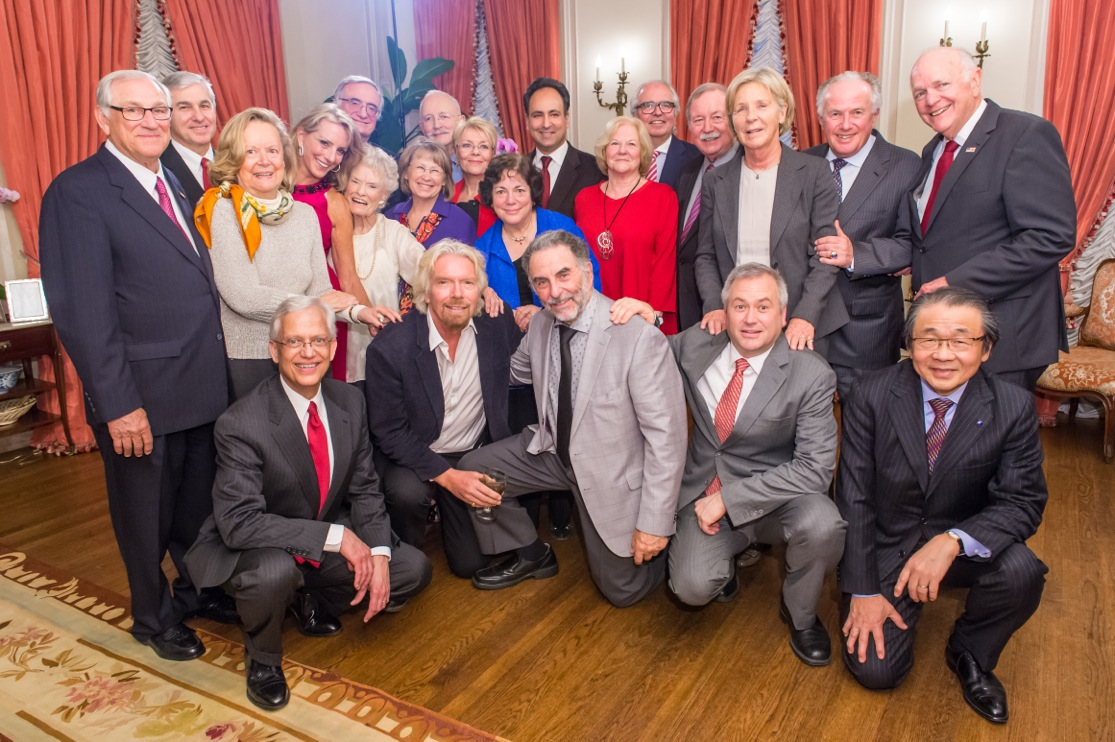
Eve Branson with the board of directors of the International Centre for Missing & Exploited Children

Branson was a member of the board of directors of the International Centre for Missing & Exploited Children ("ICMEC"), the goal of which is to help find missing children, and to stop the exploitation of children. She was a founding member of ICMEC's board of directors in 1999, seeking to generate awareness of the centre's work, and her son Richard was ICMEC's founding sponsor.

== Personal life and death ==
She married, in Frimley, Surrey, on 15 October 1949, Edward James "Ted" Branson, born on 10 March 1918, a former cavalryman, son of Sir George Arthur Harwin Branson and wife Mona Joyce Bailey. He died on 19 March 2011 in his sleep at the age of 93.

In 2011, Eva Branson escaped a fire at her son's Caribbean home on Necker Island. She died from COVID-19 complications on 8 January 2021, during the COVID-19 pandemic in the United Kingdom at the age of 96. A celebration of her life was posted online by her son Richard. He revealed that he owed his career to his mother, explaining that she had found a necklace in the 1960s and after the police let her keep the jewellery, because nobody had claimed it, she sold it and gave him the funds. "Without that £100, I could never have started Virgin," he said.

== Legacy ==
VMS Eve, the carrier mothership for Virgin Galactic and launch platform for SpaceShipTwo-class Virgin SpaceShips (Tail number: N348MS,) was named in her honour by Virgin Galactic and her son Sir Richard Branson.

A new Airbus A350-1000, G-VEVE – Fearless Lady, has been named in her honour and was delivered to Virgin Atlantic in December 2021 as the first aircraft optimised for the airline's leisure routes.
