= Cell bank =

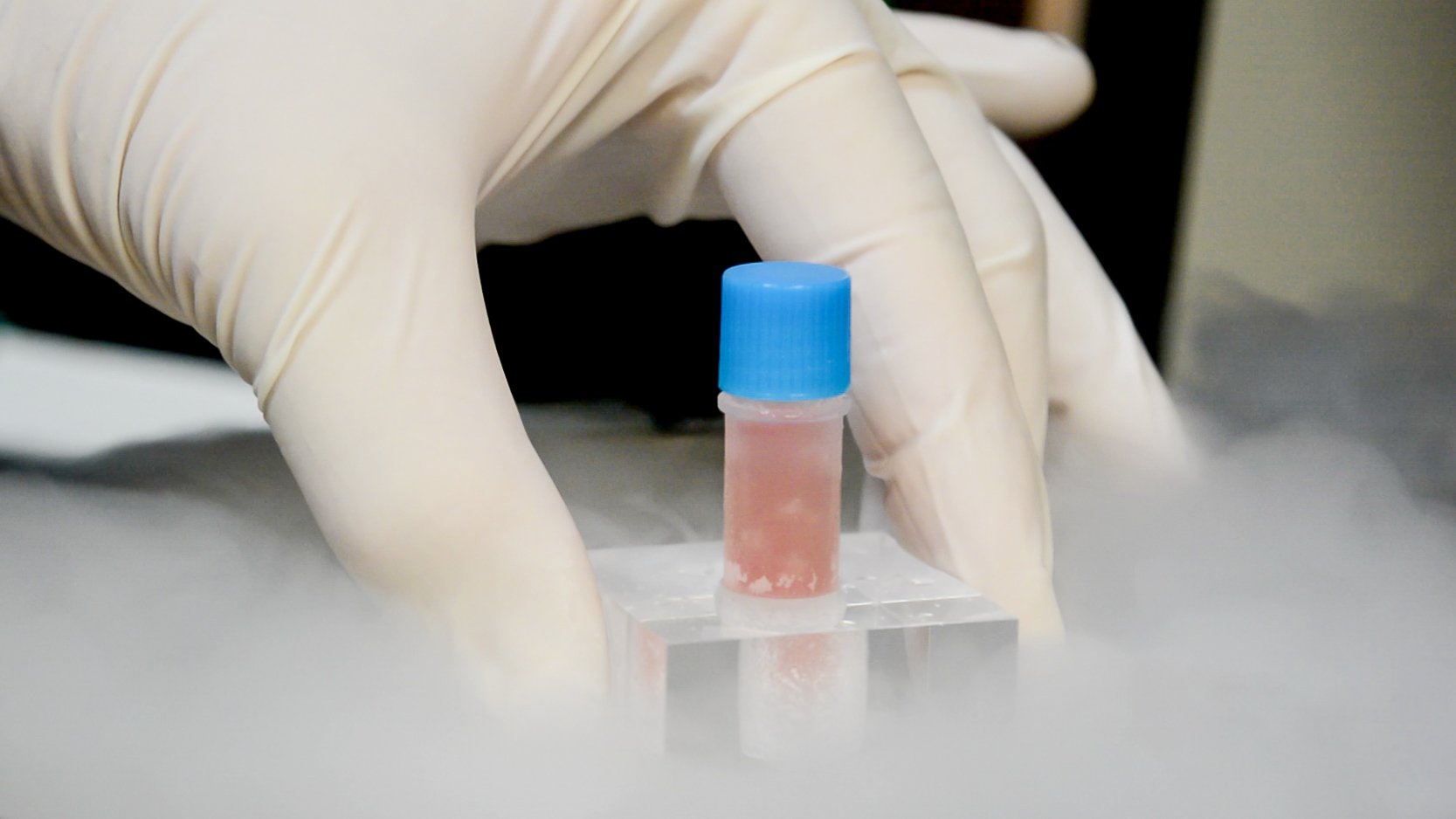
Stem cell vial

A cell bank is a facility that stores cells of specific genome for the purpose of future use in a product or medicinal needs, but can also describe the entity of stored cells itself. Cell banks often contain expansive amounts of base cell material that can be utilized for various projects. Cell banks can be used to generate detailed characterizations of cell lines and can also help mitigate cross-contamination of a cell line. Utilizing cell banks also reduces the cost of cell culture processes, providing a cost-efficient alternative to keeping cells in culture constantly. Cell banks are commonly used within fields including stem cell research and pharmaceuticals, with cryopreservation being the traditional method of keeping cellular material intact. Cell banks also effectively reduce the frequency of a cell sample diversifying from natural cell divisions over time.

== Types of cell banks ==
When referring to cell banks as a resource in fields like biopharmaceutical manufacturing, four different types can be distinguished:

- Research and development cell banks
- Master cell bank
- Working cell bank
- End-of-production cell bank

While research and development cell banks (R&D CBs) are, as the name already suggests, used for research purposes, they also function as platforms for so-called master cell banks (MCBs). With a sufficient number of validated cells, they are the starting point in the biopharmaceutical production process of cell-based products. The production itself is performed in working cell banks (WCBs), and once the production process has been completed, an end-of-production cell bank (EoPCB) is established as a reference as well as for quality control.

== Storage ==
Before putting the donated cell lines into storage, they are first proliferated and multiplied into a large number of identical cells before being stored in a number of cryovials. Along with the cells, cryoprotection agents are also added to the vials to protect the cells from rupturing from ice crystals during the freezing process. 10% DMSO solution is a common cryoprotection agent. These cryovials are then placed into a tray, labeled with the cell line's genetic data, and placed into cryogenic freezers. The freezers contain nitrogen in either liquid or vapor form, and the cells are frozen at a rate of -1 to -3 degrees Celsius per minute until a temperature of -196 degrees Celsius is reached. At a temperature of -196 degrees Celsius, metabolic processes within the cells are significantly slowed to stop all cell growth, thus preserving the cell line, which is especially useful when the cell line has a limited number of cell divisions. Cells can be stored for an extended amount of time in this state, reducing the rate of degradation of cellular material.

== Freezing ==
The general freezing process for mammalian cells involves suspending a small density of the cells of interest in a solution of cryopreservation agents in a cryovial and freezing the cells to a temperature of -196 degrees Celsius. A slow freezing rate is important to maintaining the health of the cell culture. Freezing the cells at a rate of -1 to -3 degrees Celsius per minute is generally acceptable in maintaining cell culture health. Freezing too quickly risks damaging the cells. At a freezing rate of -5 degrees Celsius per minute, significant decreases of the thawed cell culture is observed. Even more pronounced decreases in cell culture health is observed at faster freezing rates, to the point that the cell culture cannot maintain a cell density. The use of cryopreservation agents is also key to the freezing process. A common cryoprotection agent used is 10% solution of DMSO, which acts to protect the cells from the rupturing caused by ice crystals during freezing and during thawing. DMSO has been observed to be toxic to cells, and requires dilution after the cells are thawed.

== Thawing ==
Rapid thaws are recommend in bringing the cells out of cryopreservation and starting up their normal metabolic processes. Minimizing the exposure of the cryovial and its contents to room, or ambient temperatures is important. Rapid thaws are important to prevent the contents of the vial from melting and refreezing rapidly, which could cause ice crystals to form rupture the cells in the vial. Thaws can be performed in a few minutes within a water bath at a temperature around 37 °C. Experimentation has shown that a slower thaw in a controlled environment such as an incubator also can be used to safely thaw cryofrozen cells. Thawing in an incubator avoids the risk of contamination involved in thawing in a water bath, however takes a significantly longer amount of time and resources. Post thaw, the cells need to be transferred from the cryovial into another vessel and resuspended in media. By diluting the concentration of the cryoprotection agent present, negative effects such as toxicity from the cryoprotection agents on metabolically active cells can be mitigated.

== History ==
Originally, scientists kept collections of cellular material for their own use, but not for the scientific community at large. The first person accredited with making a cell bank for widespread use was Král, a Czech scientist who created his cell bank collection in the late 1890s.

Currently, there are a large number of "culture collections and bioresource centers" that serve an individual part of the process of bioengineering. Some examples of these include the World Federation for Culture Collections and the International Society for Biological and Environmental Repositories. In January 2003, the UK Stem Cell Bank was established to serve as a central unit for specimen collection and human testing. The National Stem Cell Bank was established in October 2005 in Madison, Wisconsin in order to serve as a repository specifically for stem cell lines. It currently hosts 13 of the 21 stem cell lines that exist in the world and are listed on the Stem Cell Registry hosted by the National Institutes of Health. University of Connecticut released the Stem cell lineage database in 2010.

In 1987, the World Health Organization established a reference cell bank to provide a resource for the development of vaccines and other biological medicines. Another reference cell bank was established by the World Health Organization in 2007 as a result of stability issues with MRC-5 cells.

== See also ==
- Tissue bank
