= G. A. H. Branson =

English rower, barrister and judge (1871–1951)

The Right Honourable Sir George Branson PC
- Branson in 1930
- Born: George Arthur Harwin Branson; 11 July 1871; Great Yarmouth, England
- Died: 23 April 1951 (aged 79)
- Education: Bedford School; Trinity College, Cambridge
- Spouse: Mona Joyce Bailey (m. 1915)
- Children: 2
- Relatives: Eve Branson (daughter-in-law); Richard Branson (grandson); Vanessa Branson (granddaughter)

Sir George Arthur Harwin Branson PC (11 July 1871 – 23 April 1951), known professionally as G. A. H. Branson, was an English barrister and High Court judge. In that role he was known as Mr Justice Branson. He is the paternal grandfather of Sir Richard Branson.

== Biography ==
Branson was son of James Henry Arthur Branson (29 October 1839 – 16 April 1902), Senior Acting Magistrate at Calcutta, India, and Mary Ann Brown (23 February 1842 – 31 December 1923).

He was educated at Bedford School, where he was a scholar, and at Trinity College, Cambridge, where he was an Exhibitioner. He took his degree in the Classical Tripos and was also Captain of First Trinity and a rowing blue, taking the bow of the Cambridge Boat for the Boat Race of 1893.

In 1894, after leaving Cambridge, Branson was articled to a firm of solicitors, Markby, Stewart & Co. He also became a member of the Inner Temple and in 1899 was called to the bar and joined the Northern Circuit. Writing books on the Stock Exchange helped to make his name as a young barrister, and he was Junior Counsel to the Treasury from 1912 to 1921.

In 1916, Branson took part in the trial of Sir Roger Casement for treason, acting for the Director of Public Prosecutions as junior to F. E. Smith. The court decided that a comma should be read in the text of the Treason Act 1351, crucially widening the sense so that "in the realm or elsewhere" referred to where acts of treason were done and not to where the "King's enemies" may be. It was thus claimed that Casement was "hanged on a comma". In 1918 he was elected as a Master of the Bench of the Inner Temple.

In 1921 he was knighted and appointed a Justice of the High Court of Justice, King's Bench Division, serving until 1939. He was the judge in Warner Brothers Pictures Inc v Nelson [1937] 1 KB 209, a dispute between the actor Bette Davis and her employers, Warner Bros.

In January 1940 he was sworn of the Privy Council. He died on 23 April 1951. Who's Who reported that his address at the time was Bullswater House, Pirbright, Surrey.

== Personal life ==
In 1915, Branson married Mona Joyce Bailey (c. 1890 – 2 October 1964), a younger daughter of Major George James Bailey (, 15 Aug 1849 – 15 May 1920) and Edith Emma Headley (4 March 1852 – 18 July 1925). They had one son, Edward James "Ted" Branson (10 March 1918 – 19 March 2011), former Cavalryman, who married on 15 October 1949 to Evette Huntley Flindt, and one daughter.

Branson continued his interest in sport and was a lifelong member of the Leander Club.

In 1950, shortly before his death, his son Edward James Branson became the father of the future billionaire Sir Richard Branson.

== Books ==
- George Arthur Harwin Branson, The Stock Exchange and its Machinery (London Chamber of Commerce, 1903)
- Sir Walter George Salis Schwabe, George Arthur Harwin Branson, A Treatise on the Laws of the Stock Exchange (London: Stevens & Sons, 1905)
