= Warner Brothers Pictures Inc v Nelson =

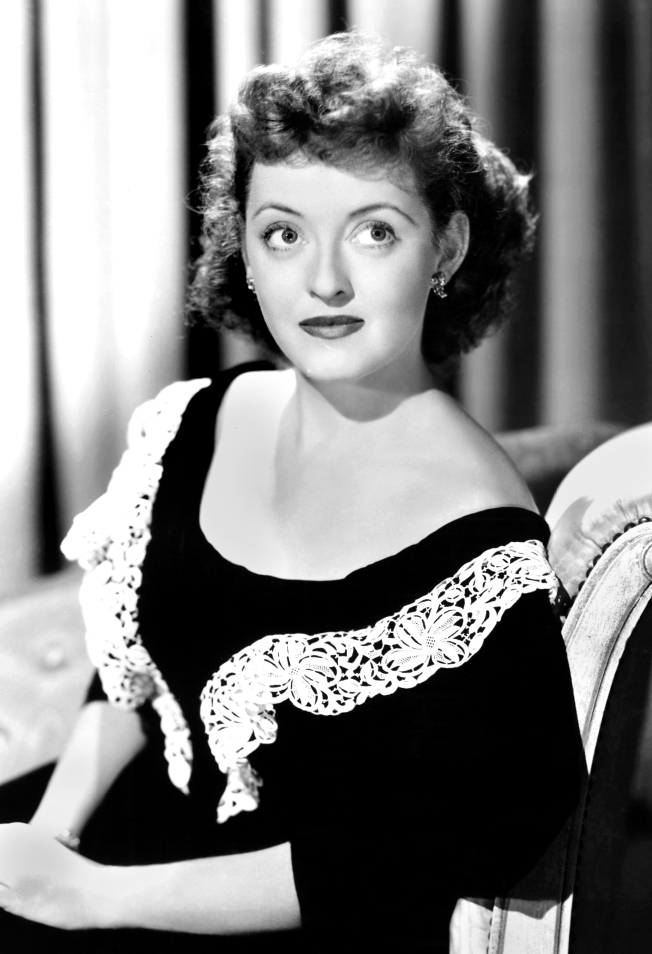
- Court: High Court
- Full case name: Warner Brothers Pictures Inc v Nelson
- Decided: 19 October 1936
- Citation: [1937] 1 KB 209

Court membership
- Judge sitting: Branson J

Keywords
- Injunction; Contract for personal services; Restrictive covenant

Warner Brothers Pictures Inc v Nelson [1937] 1 KB 209 was a judicial decision of the English courts relating to the contract of employment between the actress Bette Davis (who was sued under her married name) and Warner Bros. The court upheld the contract, effectively forcing the actress to return to the United States to continue making films for Warner Bros. and complete the term of her contract.

== Background ==
Davis, an American actress, had forged a film career in the United States. She signed a contract with Warner Bros. which was expressed to last for 52 weeks, but which was renewable for a further 52 weeks at the option of Warner Bros. Under the terms of that contract she was exclusively contracted to Warners Bros. and was precluded from performing for any other person.

Convinced that her career was being damaged by a succession of mediocre films, Davis accepted an offer in 1936 to appear in two films in Britain. Knowing that she was breaching her contract with Warner Bros., she fled to Canada to avoid legal papers being served on her in the United States. Eventually, Davis was sued in the English courts. She later recalled the opening statement of the barrister, Sir Patrick Hastings KC, who represented Warner Bros. that urged the court to "come to the conclusion that this is rather a naughty young lady, and that what she wants is more money". He mocked Davis' description of her contract as "slavery" by stating, incorrectly, that she was being paid $1,350 per week. He remarked, "If anybody wants to put me into perpetual servitude on the basis of that remuneration, I shall prepare to consider it." The British press offered little support to Davis, and portrayed her as overpaid and ungrateful. Davis was represented by Sir William Jowitt KC.

Davis explained her viewpoint to a journalist: "I knew that, if I continued to appear in any more mediocre pictures, I would have no career left worth fighting for." Her counsel presented the complaints – that she could be suspended without pay for refusing a part, with the period of suspension added to her contract, that she could be called upon to play any part within her abilities, regardless of her personal beliefs, that she could be required to support a political party against her beliefs, and that her image and likeness could be displayed in any manner deemed applicable by the studio. Jack Warner testified, and was asked: "Whatever part you choose to call upon her to play, if she thinks she can play it, whether it is distasteful and cheap, she has to play it?". Warner replied: "Yes, she must play it."

== Decision ==
The case was adjudicated by Branson J in the High Court. After outlining the facts, the court noted that this was the second such contract that Mrs Nelson (as she was referred to in the judgment) had signed, and that it was at considerably increased remuneration, and that the rate of remuneration increased with each passing week under the terms of the contract. The contract also contained a provision that if Mrs Nelson refused to perform for any period, then the period of the contract was extended for a like period (clause 23).

The court held as a fact that "for no discoverable reason except that she wanted more money, [she] declined to be further bound by the agreement, left the United States and, in September, entered into an agreement in this country with a third person." It went on to hold "This was a breach of contract on her part".

The court noted that it had been heavily argued by her counsel that this was restraint of trade, although this has not been raised in the pleadings. The court nonetheless held that the contract was not in breach of the law relating to restraint of trade. The court noted that a similar contract had been upheld in Gaumont-British Picture Corporation v Alexander [1936] 2 All ER 1686.

Having decided that the court affirmed it usual practice - that it would not order specific performance of a personal service. The court then considered at great length the limits of what it could grant either by way of positive or by negative injunction. It would not force her by injunction to serve out her contract ("That the Court never does."). Accordingly, the court limited itself to injuncting Mrs Nelson from performing those services for any other person in breach of her contract. The court rejected the argument that, because she could never earn as much doing anything else, this effectively forced her to perform her contract indirectly and was thus contrary to the law. In this respect, the court followed the precedent in Grimston v Cunningham [1894] 1 QB 125.

The Court limited the length of the injunction to a period of three years. Finally, the Court limited the scope of the injunction such that it only applied within the jurisdiction of the Court. Accordingly, if Mrs Nelson was to have performed overseas, that would not breach the order of the Court. However, she might expose herself to further legal process elsewhere.

== Aftermath ==
After the case Davis returned to Hollywood, in debt and without income, to resume her career. Ironically, this was to become one of the most successful periods of her career.

== Bibliography ==
- Spada, James (1993). More Than a Woman. Little, Brown and Company. ISBN 0-316-90880-0.
- Sperling, Cass Warner; Milner, Cork Milner; Warner, Jack Jr. (1998). Hollywood Be Thy Name: The Warner Brothers Story. Prima Publishing. ISBN 0-8131-0958-2.
- Springer, John; Jack Hamilton (1978). They Had Faces Then. Citadel Press. ISBN 0-8065-0657-1.
- Stine, Whitney; Bette Davis (1974). Mother Goddam: The Story of the Career of Bette Davis. W.H. Allen and Co. Plc. ISBN 1-56980-157-6.
