= Marrakech Biennale =

The Marrakech Biennale بينالي مراكش
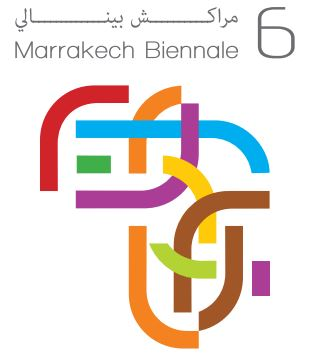
- Logo of Marrakech Biennale 6
- Genre: Biennale, Focused on Contemporary Visual Art, Literature, Film and Arts in Public Spaces
- Date: 6th edition: 24 February 2016 until 8 May 2016
- Frequency: Biennial, every two years
- Location: Marrakesh
- Years active: 2005-2016
- Founder: Vanessa Branson
- Patrons: Vanessa Branson and Abel Damoussi
- Website: www.marrakechbiennale.org

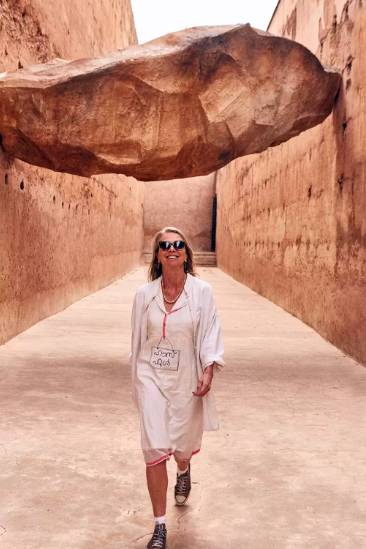
Vanessa Branson walks under the sculpture À l'abri...de rien

The Arts festival in Marrakech, now the Marrakech Biennale, is a biennale in Marrakesh, Morocco. The exhibition first took place in 2005. It was set up by Vanessa Branson and Abel Damoussi with the help of curator Danny Moynihan and Liberatum creator Pablo Ganguli. There were 2 editions of AiM (Arts in Marrakech) in Marrakesh in 2005 and 2007. respectively. In 2009, Vanessa Branson carried it forward as the Marrakech Biennale, the first major Trilingual (English, Arabic & French) festival in North Africa. It focused on Visual Art, Literature, and Film. Curated driven, with a main Visual Arts Exhibition, other arts exhibitions, installations, energetic fringe, discussions, debates and screenings based in iconic venues and settings of Marrakesh and all under the patronage of His Majesty King Mohammed VI. The 3rd biennale took place in 2009 and was curated by Abdellah Karroum and featured work by Francis Alys, Yto Barrada, Lordana Longo and Batoul S'Himi amongst many others. The main visual exhibition was in the Palais Bahia with discussions and debates at other venues including ESAV film school, El Fenn and Ksour Agafay. The 4th biennale took place in 2012 and was curated by Dr Nadim Samman and Carson Chan and shown at multiple venues such as Théâtre Royal, Koutoubia Cisterns, Bank Al-Maghrib, Cyber Parc Arsat Moulay Abdeslam and Dar Al-Ma'mûn in Marrakesh. A key focus was the artisanal traditions of Morocco and all new site-specific commissions were conceived and created on location with local craftspeople and manufacturers.The 5th biennale in 2014 and was curated Hicham Khalidi and took place in the 16th century El Badi Palace, the Dar Si Said, which houses the Museum of Moroccan Arts, the former Bank Al Maghrib in the middle of the Jemaa El Fna square. The 6th biennale, in 2016, was led by Amine Kabbage and was curated by Guggenheim Abu Dhabi curator Reem Fadda and its main venues were the 16th-century El Badi Palace and the 19th-century El Bahia Palace. It featured work including the sculpture À l'abri...de rien by Fatiha Zemmouri.
