= Vanessa Branson =

British art dealer (born 1959)

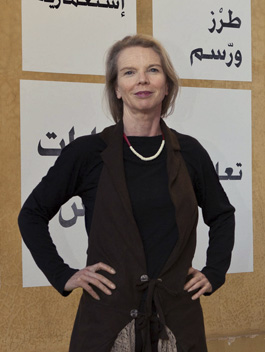
- Branson in 2012
- Born: Vanessa Gay Branson; 3 June 1959 (age 67)
- Other name: Vanessa Devereux
- Occupations: Businesswoman; author
- Years active: 1983–present
- Spouse: Robert Devereux (m. 1983; div. 1997)
- Children: 4
- Mother: Eve Branson
- Relatives: G. A. H. Branson (grandfather); Richard Branson (brother)
- Website: vanessabranson.co.uk

Vanessa Branson (born 3 June 1959) is an English businesswoman and the founder of the Marrakech Biennale.

== Early life ==
Branson is the youngest child of Eve Branson (née Evette Huntley Flindt; 1924–2021), a former ballet dancer and air hostess, and Edward James "Ted" Branson (1918–2011), a barrister. She was educated at Box Hill School. Her brother is founder of Virgin Group, Richard Branson.

== Career ==
Branson opened and ran the Vanessa Devereux Gallery on Blenheim Crescent in London from 1986 until 1991. She had married Robert Devereux in 1983 and they had four children before divorcing in 1997.

Between 1999 and 2004, Prue O’Day and Branson curated the Wonderful Fund collection which was first shown at the Museum of Marrakech. Branson is the co-owner of a luxury boutique hotel in Marrakech, El Fenn, which she purchased in 2002 with entrepreneur Howell James. In 2005 she became the president and founder of the Arts in Marrakech Festival, now known as the Marrakech Biennale. In October 2014, Branson was awarded the royal distinction of Officer of the Ouissam Aalouite at the occasion of the ceremony inaugurating the Mohammed VI Museum of Modern and Contemporary Art in Rabat for her contributions to Moroccan arts and culture.

Branson also owns and runs Eilean Shona, an island off the west coast of Scotland at the entrance to Loch Moidart. In collaboration with the Royal Society of Sculptors, a members-only residency has been created — a month-long opportunity for the winning member to live on the island and reflect upon and respond to the natural environment.

Branson's memoir, One Hundred Summers, was published in May 2020; her novel, All That is Fragile, was published in 2026.

== Bibliography ==
Year	Title	Publisher	ISBN	Pages	Notes
2020	One Hundred Summers	Mensch Publishing	9781912914142	368	Memoir.
2026	All That is Fragile	The Authors' Collective	9781066907649	318	Novel.
