= The Snaffling Pig Co =

Snack food manufacturer

Snaffling Pig Limited
- Trade name: The Snaffling Pig Co
- Type: Limited
- Industry: Snacks, cracklings
- Founded: 11 December 2013
- Founder: Nicholas Coleman, Andrew Allen and Udhitha Silva
- Headquarters: Ashampstead Common, United Kingdom
- Products: Pork scratchings, snacks and barbecues
- Number of employees: 14 (2020)
- Website: https://www.snafflingpig.co.uk/

The Snaffling Pig Co is the trading name of Snaffling Pig Limited, a British snack food manufacturer known for pork snack products.

The company appeared on the 14th season of BBC Two's Dragons’ Den in 2016, where it gained a £70,000 investment from Nick Jenkins.

== History ==
The Snaffling Pig Co began as "Giggling Pig Limited" in December 2013 when its founder, Nick Coleman, challenged Udhi Silva to a bet. The terms of the bet were that the first person to grow a company to £1m in sales revenue on just £500 seed investment would be treated to a steak dinner.

Initially, Snaffling Pig's sales were slow. According to the Snaffling Pig website, the sales accelerated when a publicity stunt in 2016 – the world's first pork scratching advent calendar – attracted over 10,000 orders. The advent calendar contains 24 bags of 6 different flavors of pork crackling, and through advent calendar sales alone, The Snaffling Pig Co sells 2.1 million packets of crackling annually.

In 2016, the company appeared on series 14 of Dragons’ Den, where it gained a £70,000 investment from ‘dragon’ Nick Jenkins.

In 2017, The Snaffling Pig Co won the Virgin 'Foodpreneur' award, with the prize a six-week retail space at the Lakeside Shopping Centre.

In 2018, The Snaffling Pig was a finalist for the Consumer Business of the year - Start Ups Awards.

In 2019, The Snaffling Pig Co surpassed its initial £750,000 funding target on equity crowdfunding platform Crowdcube and raised over £1.1 million with investment from over 1,800 investors, known as The Snaffling Pig Co's ‘Swine Diners’.

In April 2021, The Snaffling Pig Co was listed as the UK's second largest pork snacks brand, with YOY growth of 26%.

In May 2021, Snaffling Pig worked with creative agency Creative AF to produce a soundtrack for the brand, based on their motto: Piggin' Magic.

In February 2022, Snaffling Pig recalled a specific batch of 45 Gms Perfectly Salted Pork Scratchings because of the presence of Salmonella.

== Great Taste Awards ==
The Guild of Fine Food has awarded The Snaffling Pig Co a total of 12 Great Taste Awards across its snack ranges. Award-winning pork crackling and scratching flavors include Black Pepper, Low & Slow BBQ, Hot to Trot Habanero, Marvelous Maple, Perfectly Salted, and Salt 'N' Vinegar. In 2021, Snaffling Pig won the Great Taste Awards for its Chorizo Bites and Caramelised Honey & Chilli Peanuts.
