= Stem cell lineage database =

SCLD

Content
- Description: Stem Cell Lineage Database for the annotation of cell types and developmental lineages.

Contact
- Research center: University of Connecticut
- Laboratory: Department of Molecular & Cell Biology
- Authors: Edward E Hemphill
- Primary citation: Hemphill & al. (2011)
- Release date: 2010

Access
- Website: http://scld.mcb.uconn.edu

The Stem Cell Lineage Database (SCLD) is a database of resources used to identify cell lineages.

The Stem Cell Lineage Database (SCLD) was created by the University of Connecticut in order to have a more user friendly approach to retrieve and share data. The purpose of the Stem Cell Lineage Database is to consolidate the three key components into a database that is accessible and capable of storing information "about cell type gene expression, cell lineage maps and stem cell differentiation protocols for both human and mouse stem cells and endogenous developmental lineages". One of the major factors that separates SCLD from other stem cell databases is that it allows users to edit information pertaining to cell types, markers, and lineages. The database allows user to update information found from the organic developmental stages and it also allows users to discuss experimental practices that altered the stem cells.

Stem cells are cells in the body that can divide indefinitely in a culture and can be formulated into specialized cells. In biological research, these cells have become a subject of extensive research. With these cells, scientists will be able to better understand how these cells are differentiated by the process of turning on and off genes. Through this research, scientists will be able to better understand certain diseases such as cancer and how these diseases arise.

As stem cell research continues, scientists will need a database to store and share their information and research. Three key components are necessary for this database to be effective: cell type-specific gene expression profiles, anatomical and developmental relationships between cells and tissues and signals important for development and differentiation of stem cells to mature cell types.

== Database usage ==
The purpose of the database is to provide an openly available, quick reference for information pertaining to stem cell lineages. Ini the database, researchers can acquire information that can influence the expression(s) of stem cells, such information includes: experimental details such as time required, reagents, and the physical manipulations necessary to transition between cell types. By having this information openly available to the public, it gives researchers a place to meet and share information that could possibly enhance the experimental success of stem cell research as well as provide techniques to influence stem cells down specific pathways.

Also, another feature of the database is that it includes information based on in vivo and in vitro lineages. One could go in and compare certain lineage factors between in vivo and in vitro, as well as look at what factors influence the stem cells down specific pathways.

One flaw to the system is that anyone can create an account and go into the database and change information. However, if an error or such actions did take place, a person who notices the change to be incorrect can contact the database management and they will conduct the necessary measures to correct it.

Currently, the database only includes human and mouse stem cell lineages, but the database hopes to expand into more species. However, they did not specify which species they wanted to expand to.

This database could potentially help identify the subcomponents and understand the workings of hematopoiesis. Currently, research is being conducted to identify transcription control on hematopoietic stem cell differentiation. The Stem Cell Lineage Database could help compare stem cell information around the world and eliminate taking a global gene expression profiling approach, which although sufficient, is not as effective as it could be. There are other forms of Stem Cell Databases such as SyStemCell that is used to consolidate information gained by researchers focusing on stem cells. The needs for these databases are increasing with the amount of research being discovered.

== Human and mouse homology in stem cells ==
Currently, the SCLD has stem cell information for only human stem cells and mice stem cells. However, the SCLD does have the intentions to add more species to their database. Due to the ethical constraints of conducting stem cell research on humans, the use of mice has been for advances in this field of study. "The most salient ethical values implicated by the use of human participants in research are beneficence (doing good), non‐maleficence (preventing or mitigating harm), fidelity and trust within the fiduciary investigator/participant relationship, personal dignity, and autonomy pertaining to both informed, voluntary, competent decision making and the privacy of personal information". Approximately 70.1% of amino acids are conserved between mice and humans, this allows for many studies in mice to be applied to the human complications. Also when the mouse genome is compared to that of a human genome, approximately 99% has a direct counterpart in the human genome. The two mammals share common similarities because they are derived from a common ancestor that dates back 75 million years ago. Even though this divergence was millions of years ago, only about 300 of the 30,000 genes found in the mouse have no correlation to the human genome. With this research finding, scientists will be able to conduct research in a more ethical and safer way.

== Advancements in stem cell research ==
=== Sickle cell anemia ===
In one experiment, they used a chimera of mouse and human stem cells to address sickle cell anemia treatment. There are still many issues that need to be addressed before performing stem cell therapeutic techniques on humans, but advancements are being made in model organisms with homologous structures. In the sickle cell anemia example mentioned, they made a humanized sickle cell anemia mouse model by implanting human alpha-globin genes in place of mouse alpha-globin genes, and they replaced the beta-globin genes of the mouse with sickle cell effected human beta-globin genes. Following this induction, mice formed symptoms similar to the symptoms of humans with sickle cell anemia.

Through retroviral transduction of combinations of transcription factors, human and mice fibroblast cells were reprogrammed to pluripotent-stem cell-like cells (also termed "induced pluripotent stem cells," or iPS). This was used to revert these cells into stem cell-like structures that did not differentiate, and therefore did not have a specified fate (allows cells to become almost any cell within the organism). Next, they wanted to test whether or not hematopoietic progenitors (HPs) would derive from the reprogrammed iPS cells and correct the sickle cell phenotype. Through many tests, they verified that the HPs had derived from the iPS cells. Later in their results, they concluded that when these iPS cells were introduced into sickle cell anemia positive mice, they significantly improved the sickle cell anemia and that these mice were comparable to those of the control mice who were not infected with sickle cell anemia.

=== Multilineage potential of mesenchymal stem cells ===
Fetal tissue stem cells can give rise to a variety of differentiated cell types. However, many adult tissues contain populations of stem cells that have the capacity for renewal after trauma, disease, or aging. Stem cells found in human adult bone marrow also possess the ability to differentiate into different cell types as well. These adult bone marrow cells give rise to mesenchymal stem cells these give rise to the regeneration of mesenchymal tissues such as bone, cartilage, muscle, ligament, tendon, adipose, and stroma. Unwanted cells were isolated through the process of a density gradient. After this process, the removal of hematopoietic stem cells and nonadherent cells were removed by changes in the medium. In the expanded cultures, hematopoietic stem cells were not found. The mesenchymal cells appeared to be different from marrow fibroblastic cells. "As many as 50 million to 375 million cells were generated from a 10-ml marrow aspirate that was obtained from 19- to 57-year-old donors. This range of yield is expected for the expansion of primary cells. We isolated these cells from the marrow of over 350 donors, and the expanded mesenchymal cells from at least 50 donors were tested in three lineage assays, with all tested donors responding positively in these assays.

The cells did not differentiate spontaneously during culture expansion. Similarly isolated marrow mesenchymal cells maintained a normal karyotype and telomerase activity". The mesenchymal cells were placed in conditions that specified adipogenic, chondrogenic, or osteogenic conditions and differentiation. These were taken from three different adult donors and compared to two human fibroblasts. After 1 to 3 week, the cells had already begun to differentiate into their respective conditions. Adipogenic differentiation was visible through accumulation of lipid-rich vacuoles within cells (adipocytes) and they remained healthy within the culture for at least three months. Chondrogenic differentiation was evident in the development of type II collagen that is seen in articular cartilage.

Lastly, osteogenic differentiation was visible through calcium accumulation after one week. "The sensitive RT-PCR assays, in addition to the immunological and histochemical data, showed that neither the adipogenic nor the osteogenic cultures were composed of cells of multiple lineages. The chondrogenic cultures did not appear histologically to contain cells that were of the other lineages, but they did express osteopontin and alkaline phosphatase". In a controlled manner, isolated and expanded human mesenchymal stem cells could differentiate into multiple lineages. This concept of human mesenchymal stem cell differentiation can be used for future approaches to damaged or diseased tissue throughout the human body.

This research example could be integrated into the SCLD website by the authors supplying the in vitro and/or in vivo conditions they used to influence these stem cells. This database is a tool that could provide useful and necessary information to researchers across the world.

== See also ==
- Cell lineage tree
