= Umbrella brand =

Marketing strategy

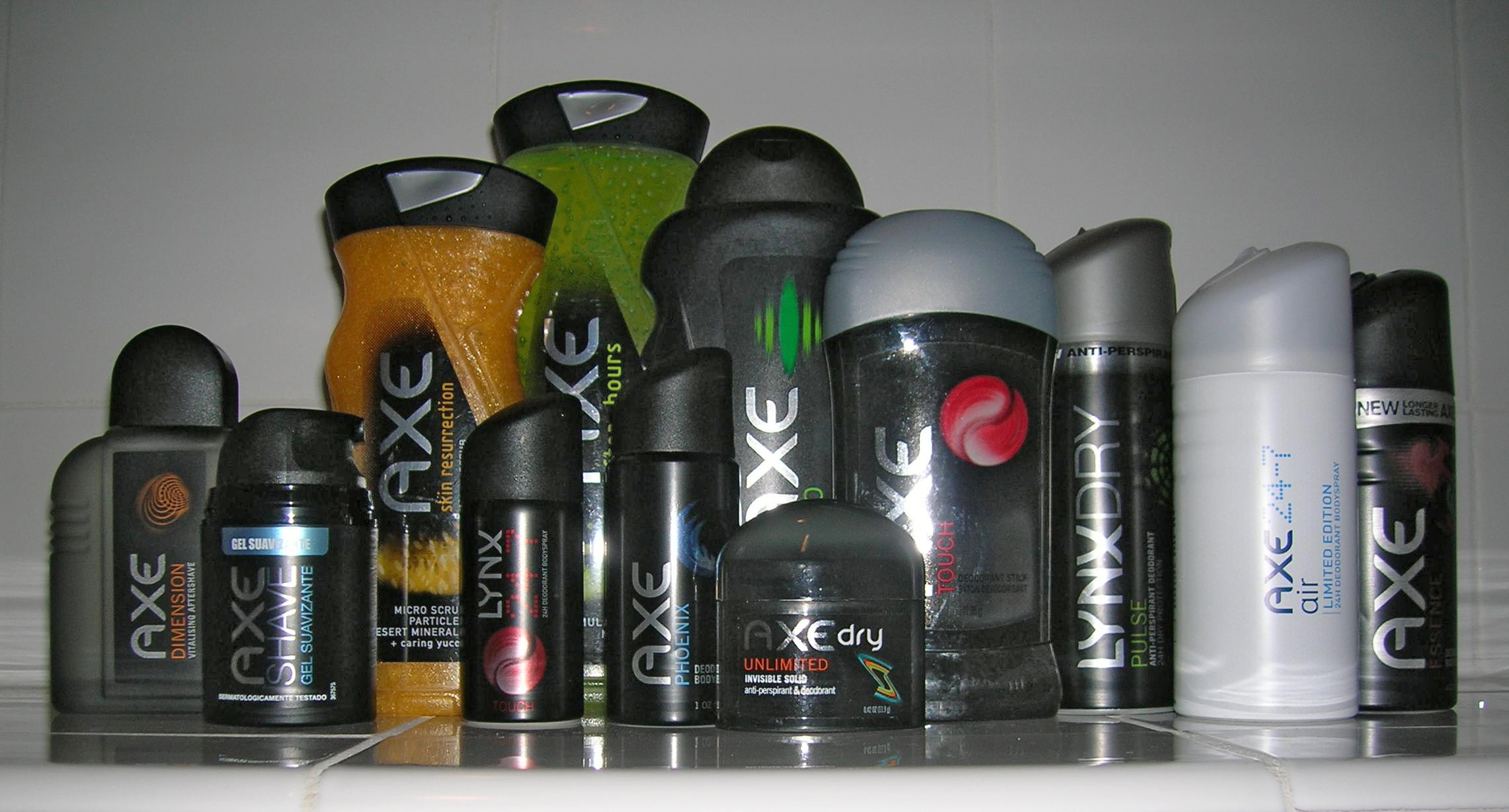
Axe (by Unilever) has a range of similar products that use the same family brand (Axe deodorants, Axe shampoos, Axe shower gels, Axe hair stylers, etc.).

Umbrella branding (also known as family branding) is a marketing practice involving the use of a single brand name for the sale of two or more related products. Umbrella branding is mainly used by companies with a positive brand equity (value of a brand in a certain marketplace). All products use the same means of identification and lack additional brand names or symbols etc. This marketing practice differs from brand extension in that umbrella branding involves the marketing of similar products, rather than differentiated products, under one brand name. Hence, umbrella branding may be considered as a type of brand extension. The practice of umbrella branding does not disallow a firm to implement different branding approaches for different product lines (e.g. brand extension).

== Strategy ==
Marketers may increase the chance of success for a new product launch by using a sub-brand name and a parent brand name simultaneously. In the article by Howard Pong Yuen LAM and other co-authors, they report the successful case of using two brand names—dual branding strategy—by practitioners in China for the Minute Maid Orange Pulp juice drink launch:

A suggestive sub-brand name helps consumers recall the key benefits and features of the new product. A suggestive parent brand name communicates the benefits of the product category. A dual branding strategy addresses the problem of using only one brand name for a new product launch. After the successful launch of the first new product by a parent brand, marketers are able to launch other new products under other sub-brand names in the future to meet different consumer needs. Marketers may use the same parent brand to introduce different products to build scale for the brand, and are able to clearly differentiate the different product offerings under different sub-brand names. If a company acquires a brand from another company, a marketer may position the acquired brand as a sub-brand under the parent brand if the marketer has defined the business scope of the parent brand broadly enough and with a suggestive parent brand name.

== Purpose ==
Umbrella branding is used to provide uniformity to certain product lines by grouping them under a single brand name, making them more easily identifiable and hence enhancing their marketability. All products under the same corporate umbrella (masterbrand providing structure and credibility to other products of the corporation) are expected to have uniform quality and user experience (e.g. All products carrying the parent brand must be of the same high quality standards).

Factors that may determine the impact of umbrella branding include:

1. The degree of commonality among the products falling under the corporate umbrella (e.g. Whether the products may act as substitutes for each other).
2. The brand equity of a corporation (e.g. Whether the brand is known in its product market).

== Theories ==
Various theories attempt to explain a consumer's decisions and judgements during product purchasing that cause umbrella branding to be a successful marketing strategy.

=== Categorization theory ===
The categorization theory is based upon the notion that consumers tend to categorize products by associating them to brands and their past experiences with those particular brands (stored in their category memory) in order to evade the initial confusion caused by the extensive choice of products they are presented with. New information on certain products are categorized into various sections such as product class (e.g. beverage) and brand (e.g. Coca-Cola) and then stored. Afterwards, consumers evaluate the product quality through past experiences with the brand's products as well as the brand equity.

This theory also explains for the popularity of umbrella branding. Consumers tend to evaluate new products not only by positive brand equity but also if the brand's concept is consistent with their extended products. For instance, assuming that the consumer had satisfactory past experiences with the company's products, if Apple Inc. would develop and sell a new version of a Macbook, consumers would deem it more reliable and potentially of superior quality rather than if Apple would produce a new beverage due to Apple's past product line.

=== Schema congruity theory ===
The schema congruity theory suggests that the storage of new information and retrieval of memory is majorly influenced by past expectations. Schemas are a human's personal cognitive representations of the environment that guide their perceptions, thoughts and actions. Schemas go through constant change as a human experiences and learns new information. Nonetheless, the new information is firstly evaluated on the basis of existing schemas. Relating the theory to consumer evaluation of products, a consumer already possesses pre-existing schemas from past experiences with certain brands and therefore new products are evaluated based on the existing schema the consumer has with the certain brand. This theory is quite similar to the categorization theory; however, the schema congruity theory places emphasis on the consumer's past experiences with the brand which is influenced by the surrounding environment.

=== Confirmation bias ===
Confirmation bias is a form of statistical bias, describing the tendency to seek for or interpret evidence in ways that support one's existing beliefs. After a consumer creates a preference of one brand over others, any additional feature that may be common between various brands will most likely only strengthen the consumer's pre-existing preference, causing them to disregard other brands. Hence, a positive brand equity may not be as influential if a consumer already has a pre-existing brand preference.

== Benefits ==
Umbrella branding has become a popular marketing practice utilized by companies due to its various potential benefits. Such marketing practice may create advertising efficiencies through the reduced costs of brand development. This strategy reduces a firm's marketing costs due to the consumer-brand association through which consumers already recognize certain brands, making new products more easily identifiable. Consequently, the market entry for umbrella branded products is relatively inexpensive since reputable brands can take advantage of past marketing efforts. Furthermore, a company benefits from advertising efficiencies since umbrella branding focuses on the promotion of a single brand rather, than multiple ones. For instance, Apple Inc. adds new products (e.g. Macbook Pro, Apple Watch) to their line and benefits from past marketing since consumers use previous information to make an inference about a product with the same brand name, allowing Apple to focus on promoting the corporate brand, rather than multiple individual brands. Additionally, the use of umbrella branding does not prevent companies from implementing other methods of brand extension, enabling them to remain flexible with marketing strategies. Finally, the success of one umbrella branded product may translate to other products under the same corporate umbrella due to the positive brand equity.

== Risks ==
A major risk of utilizing umbrella branding is that it may result unsuccessful in promoting new products if the company does not have a strong brand equity. Secondly, the consumer's experience with one umbrella branded product may affect their perception of other products and services falling under the same corporate umbrella as well as the brand itself. Consequently, if one umbrella branded product does not satisfy the consumer's expectations, the other products sold under the same brand are also likely to suffer. Thus, the company might result in a negative brand equity (also known as brand equity dilution). Thirdly, umbrella branding is only beneficial when promoting relatable products through which consumers could recognize the brand. For instance, the Starbucks brand is associated to coffee-related products and therefore consumers would mainly recognize the brand on products related to the specific market. Lastly, cannibalization (reduction in sales volume due to the introduction of a new product by the same company) may result when related products are introduced under the same corporate brand as internal product competition will lead to consumers choosing between products from the same brand, stunting future investment into product creation of the same product line under the corporate umbrella.

== Popular usage ==
Starbucks Corporation, Virgin Group, Procter & Gamble, Unilever, Apple Inc. and The Coca-Cola Company are examples of multinational companies that use umbrella branding in some of their product lines.

=== Starbucks Corporation ===
Starbucks Corporation (operating as Starbucks coffee) is an American multinational coffee company, which markets all of their products under their corporate brand name. Some products produced by Starbucks include:

- Starbucks Coffee – Various types of coffees.
- Starbucks Tea – Various types of teas.
- Starbucks Drink-ware – Various types of drink-ware such as cups, mugs and tumblers.
- Starbucks Equipment – Various types of equipment such as coffee machines.
- Starbucks Syrups and Toppings – Various types of syrups and toppings.

=== Virgin Group ===
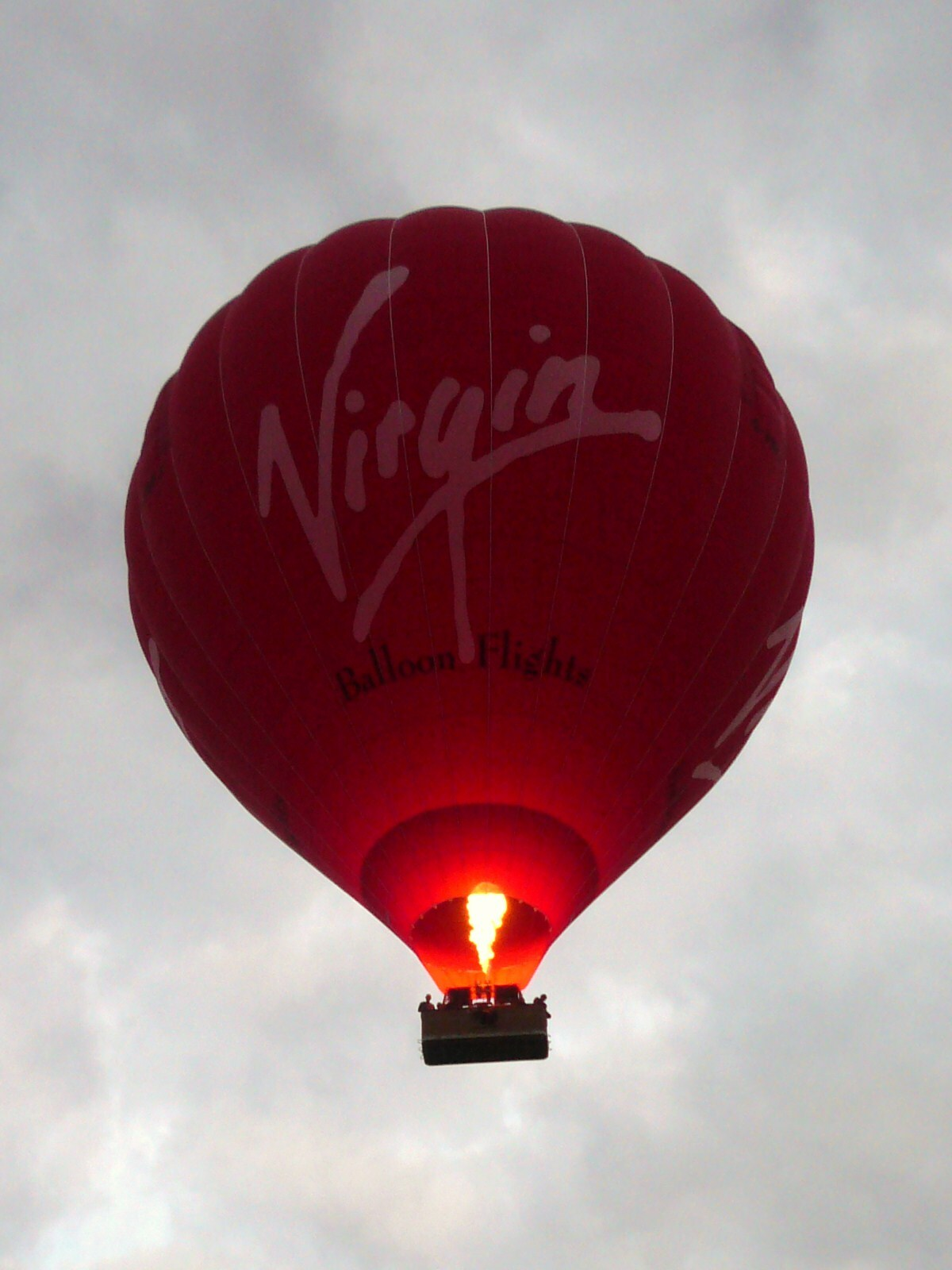
Virgin Group Ltd. Corporate brand logo

Virgin Group Ltd. is a British multinational branded investment corporation. Virgin is one of the world's most recognized brands, which has used various types of brand extensions, including umbrella branding. Virgin has 33 branches that operate under the Virgin name; however, the practice of umbrella branding is observed in their industry-specific brands (e.g. Virgin Drinks, which was a subsidiary of Virgin Group that marketed Virgin Cola and Virgin Vodka) including:

- Virgin Green Fund
- Virgin Atlantic
- Virgin Books
- Virgin Games
- Virgin Vacations
- Virgin Spa
- Virgin Earth
- Virgin Money
- Virgin Media
- Virgin Mobile

=== Procter & Gamble ===
Procter & Gamble corporate logo

Procter & Gamble (also known as P&G) is an American multinational corporation, providing a range of consumer products. Although P & G create individual product brands (e.g. Pampers or Pantene), umbrella branding is implemented within the individual brands. Some individual brands owned by P&G include:

- Pantene – Brand of haircare products, including shampoos, dry shampoos, conditioners, moistures, hair-styling products and others.
- Oral-B – Brand of oral-hygiene products such as toothbrushes, toothpastes, dental floss and mouthwashes.
- Gillette – Brand of men's safety razors and other personal care products such as shaving gels, foams, skin care, deodorants and shower gels.
- Vicks – Brand of over-the-counter medication including medication for cold & flu, cough relief, sinus relief and occasional sleeplessness.

P&G create individual brands for different product lines and then implement umbrella branding within those brands in order to control profitable market sections. This strategy allows P&G to abstain from the risk of damaging the corporate brand's image from the release of an unsuccessful product, as the brands are not interconnected.

=== Unilever ===
Unilever text logo

Unilever is a British-Dutch multinational company providing various consumer goods. Similar to Procter & Gamble, Unilever implements umbrella branding within the individual brands it creates including:

- Axe/Lynx – Brand of male grooming products such as: deodorants, shower gels, body wash, shampoos, conditioners and hair stylers.
- Dove – Brand of personal care products for males and females such as: antiperspirants/deodorants, body washes, lotions, facial and hair care products.
- Lux – Brand manufacturing a range of personal hygiene products including: shower gels, shampoos, conditioners, beauty soaps, perfumes and bath additives.
- Ben & Jerry's – Company/brand that manufactures ice cream, frozen yogurt and sorbet.

=== Apple Inc. ===
Apple Inc. corporate brand logo

Apple Inc. is an American multinational technology corporation that develops and sells a range of consumer electronic goods and services. Apple Inc. market all their products under their corporate brand name including:

- Macintosh – Line of personal computers developed by Apple Inc.
- iPhone – Line of smartphones developed by Apple Inc.
- iPad – Line of tablet computers developed by Apple Inc.
- iPod – Line of portable media-players developed by Apple Inc.
- Apple Watch – Smart-watch developed by Apple Inc.

=== The Coca-Cola Company ===
The Coca-Cola Company is a multinational corporation manufacturing various beverages. The corporation also implements umbrella branding within the individual brands for various flavored beverages including:

The Coca-Cola Company corporate brand logo

- Coca-Cola – Brand of carbonated soft-drinks that are manufactured in different variants such as: Coca-Cola, Diet Coke, Cherry Coke, Vanilla Coke, Coca-Cola Zero and Coca-Cola Life.
- Fanta – Brand of fruit-flavored carbonated soft-drinks that are manufactured in different variants, with the most popular flavors being: Fanta Orange, Fanta Orange Zero, Fanta Lemon, Fanta Lemon Zero and Fanta Fruit Twist (view full list here).
- Minute Maid – Brand of various fruit beverages, including 100 different fruit juices.

== See also ==
- Brand
- Brand management
- Brand architecture
- Brand extension
- Corporate branding
- Individual branding
- Employer branding
- Internet branding
- Nation branding
- Place branding
- Personal branding
- Co-branding
- Branding agency
- Faith branding
- School branding
