= Classic Cola =

Classic Cola may refer to:

- Classic Cola (Sainsbury's)
- Olvi Cola, formerly Classic Cola
- Coca Cola Classic
