= Virgin Drinks =

Defunct drink company

- Company type: Cola, Vodka, Energy Drinks
- Founded: 1994; 31 years ago, United Kingdom
- Defunct: 2007; 18 years ago
- Products: Virgin Cola, Virgin Vodka

Virgin Drinks was a company that marketed Virgin Cola and Virgin Vodka. It was a subsidiary of the Virgin Group owned by Richard Branson.

The company was started in 1994 in conjunction with Cott to oversee and manage the product of Virgin Cola, Virgin's first-ever drink. The company was first based in Folkestone, Kent, in the United Kingdom. Virgin Cola was launched in early 1994. The drink had big enough success for Virgin Drinks to go on to produce Virgin Vodka.

The company had previously also tried to market a range of beverages in the same functional energy class as Red Bull and Red Devil. These beverages were available in three different flavours (including Lemon and Lime) and were marketed in day-time versions (Virgin DT) and night-time versions (Virgin NT, a FAB with added vodka). These were only around for a very short amount of time.

After thirteen years, the brand started to massively decline as rival Coca-Cola had made exclusive distribution deals in big stores and restaurants. This led to Virgin only being sold in select supermarkets and local stores. Virgin Group decided it could not compete with cola rivals. In 2007, Virgin Drinks sold over the rights of Virgin Cola to a company called Silver Spring Soft Drinks. Virgin Vodka was discontinued when Virgin Drinks failed to find a buyer. Virgin Drinks were made defunct in 2007.
