= Rowan Gormley =

South African-born entrepreneur (born 1962)

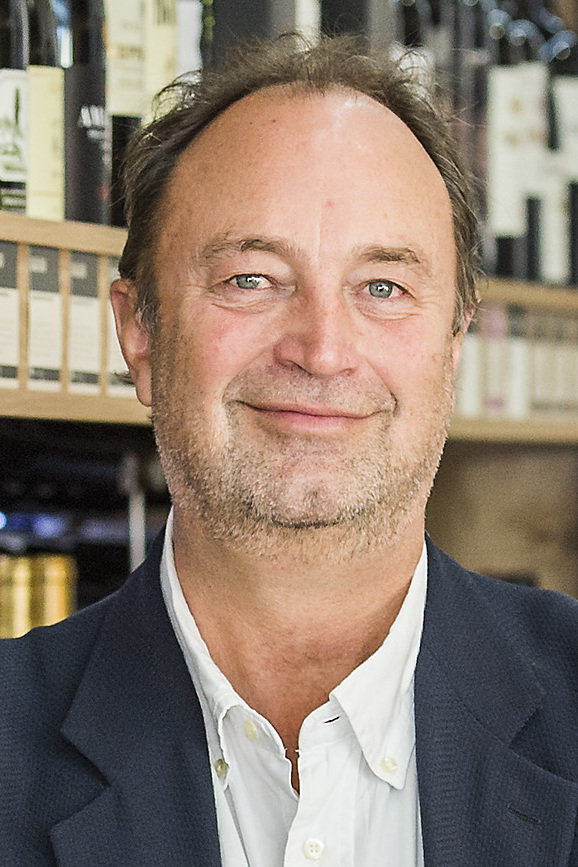
- Born: 8 June 1962 (age 63); South Africa
- Other name: Rowbags
- Occupations: Founder of nakedwines.com, Former group CEO of Majestic Wine PLC
- Website: Rowan Gormley at Nakedwines.com

Rowan Gormley (born 8 June 1962) is a South African-born entrepreneur, who founded Naked Wines.

== Early life ==
Gormley studied at Selborne College, East London and the University of Cape Town. He trained as an accountant with the firm Arthur Andersen LLC. in South Africa for three years before moving to the United Kingdom in 1987 to work in venture capital for Electra Capital Partners.

== Career ==
Gormley was in private equity for seven years before going to work for Richard Branson in 1994. Branson brought him to Virgin to identify new business opportunities.

When he spotted financial services as a potential area for Virgin to explore, Branson asked Gormley to run it, and Virgin Direct (now Virgin Money) was born in 1995 with Gormley as CEO.

Whilst at Virgin Direct, Gormley was also behind the launch of The One Account, now a part of Royal Bank of Scotland.

After leaving Virgin Money, he launched three new start-ups. His first was Orgasmic Wines, with the help of his business partner Laura Knight and his brother Clinton Gormley. The firm became Virgin Wines in 2000 when Richard Branson bought into the business.

Laithwaites subsequently bought Virgin Wines, and Gormley left the company in June 2008.

== Naked Wines ==
Gormley set up Naked Wines in December 2008 with eight of the old Virgin Wines team. Naked Wines was launched in the US and Australia in 2012.

On 10 April 2015, Naked Wines was acquired by Majestic Wine for up to £70m, and Gormley was appointed CEO of the enlarged group. Gormley announced his transformation plan for Majestic Wine in November 2015 and set the Group a new goal to achieve £500m annual sales by 2019.

In December 2019, the company announced that the business would be restructured. The Majestic portion of the business, including stores and branding, were sold to private equity firm Fortress Investment Group. Majestic Wines plc was renamed Naked Wines plc. In effect, the previous shareholders of Majestic became the new shareholders of Naked Wines. Gormley remained CEO of Naked.

In November 2019, Gormley was succeeded as CEO by former COO Nick Devlin.
