= Virgin Wines =

Online Wine Retailer

- Formerly: Fax Style Limited (July 1999–August 1999); Orgasmic Wines Limited (1999–2000)
- Company type: Retail
- Industry: Wine
- Founder: Virgin Group
- Headquarters: United Kingdom
- Areas served: United Kingdom; Australia; United States
- Key people: Jay Wright (UK); Rachel Robinson (AU)
- Products: Wine
- Parent: Virgin Wines Holding Company Limited (UK)
- Website: virginwines.co.uk

Virgin Wines Online Limited, trading as Virgin Wines, is an online wine retailer based in the United Kingdom.

The company was established in 2000 by Richard Branson's Virgin Group, and in 2005 was bought by Direct Wines. In November 2013, CEO Jay Wright, and the management team, supported by Mobeus Equity Partners and Connection Capital provided a combined debt and equity package to support the £15.9 million management buy-out.

== History ==
Established under Richard Branson's Virgin banner in 2000, Virgin Wines became a subsidiary of Direct Wines in 2005. However Virgin Wines kept the Virgin name. They continue to work closely with the Virgin Group.

Jay Wright, founder of Warehouse Wines, became Managing Director of Virgin Wines in June 2008. His arrival began a significant period of restructuring, which included merging the Warehouse Wines brand with that of Virgin Wines. The merged company combined both businesses by capitalising upon Virgin's presence in the online sector and Warehouse Wines’ mail order experience.

In July 2013, Virgin Wines won the award for innovator of the year at the International Wine Challenge Merchant of the Year Awards.

In November 2013, Mobeus Equity Partners and Connection Capital provided a combined debt and equity package to support the £15.9 million management buy-out of Virgin Wines from Direct Wines to make the company fully independent, owned by its management team. The Virgin name was maintained and Virgin Wines continues to work with the Virgin group.

In 2015 Virgin reported an increase in turnover for its main online business of 13% in the year to 3 July, the first full financial year following the management buy-out. Annual sales nudged £40 million and trading profit stood at £4.3 million.

In 2021 the company announced its intention to join the London stock market with a listing on the AIM market. In a survey by the consumer magazine Which? published in 2025, Virgin Wines came last out of the six wine clubs/societies surveyed; in terms of customer service and value for money it rated 65%, compared with 93% for The Wine Society, 77% for Laithwaites Wine, Naked Wines and The Sunday Times Wine Club and 76% for Majestic Wine.
