= Bing (soft drink) =

Carbonated soft drink

- Type: carbonated soft drink
- Manufacturer: Silver Spring Mineral Water Company Limited
- Country of origin: England
- Color: Red/Orange
- Related products: Silver Spring Mineral Water Company Limited; Irn-Bru; Bing cherry

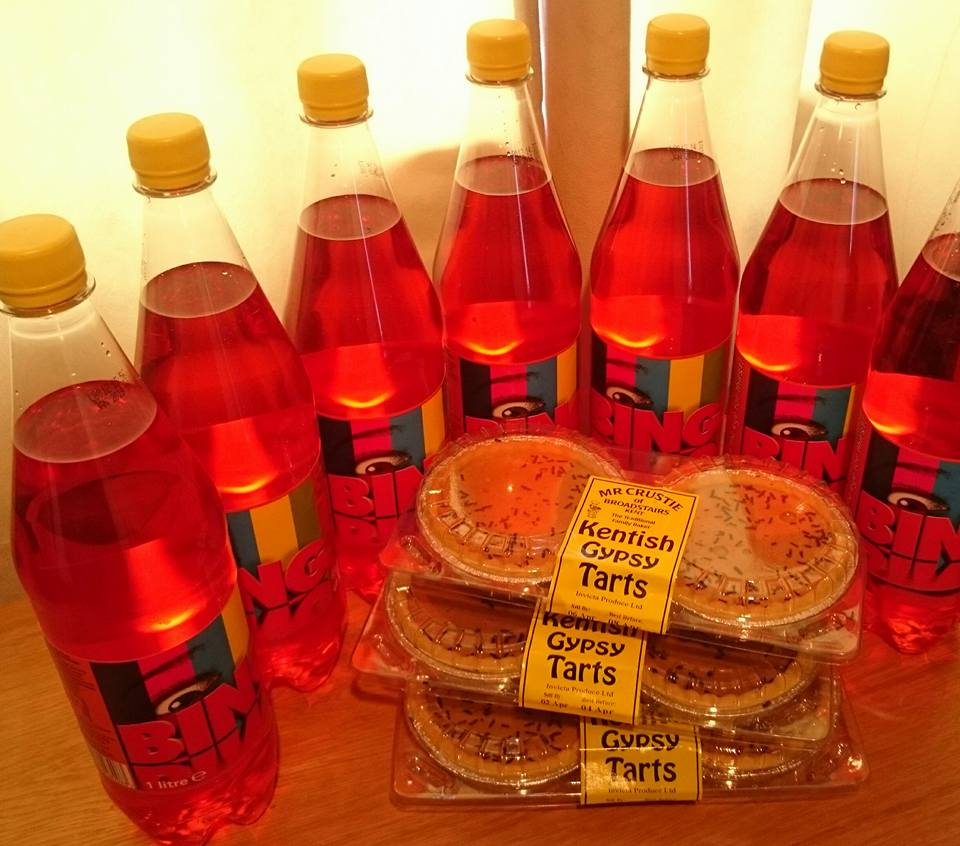
Current production Bing 2018

Bing is a soft drink formerly produced by the Silver Spring Mineral Water Company Limited. The company was based in Folkestone, Kent, UK, until 2013, when the company was liquidated.

The current label says Bing is being bottled by CBL Drinks for Speaking Water Brands Ltd, a company based in Purley, Surrey. These companies have however changed name in 2016. It is unclear who currently produces Bing.

It was dark orange in colour and had a cherryade quality to it. The flavour has been compared by some to original Tizer (before they removed the artificial flavourings).

The name 'Bing' comes from the original producer of the drink, one Edwin Bing of Canterbury, who ran a chemist and mineral water business in Canterbury. His company 'Bing's Mineral Waters ltd' was bought by Silver Spring in 1968. The distribution of Bing was very limited: it was principally available in the County of Kent, but also in London and Essex.

== See also ==
- Bing (disambiguation)
- List of defunct consumer brands

== Bibliography ==
- Samuelson, Maurice (1983). "How a PET notion made Dan Ludlow Competitive." Financial Times. March 30.
- Terry, Fiona (2002). "Soft Drink Profits Will Dry Up Unless Firm Keeps Expanding." Sunday Times. January 27.
