= SoloPower =

Solar energy company founded in 2005

- Type: Private
- Industry: Solar Energy
- Founded: 2005
- Headquarters: San Jose, California, U.S.
- Key people: Tim Harris (CEO); Ryan Benton (CFO)
- Products: Solar panels
- Website: solopower.com

SoloPower was a solar energy company developing and manufacturing Copper indium gallium selenide (CIGS) thin-film flexible Photo-voltaic Solar Panels. The company used a special electroplating technology to utilize nearly 100% of its materials.

SoloPower was based in San Jose, California, and achieved the distinction of being the first company to obtain UL Certification of CIGS flexible solar panels in 2010. This was lauded as a significant achievement by California Governor Arnold Schwarzenegger. Later the same year, the company also received IEC Certification (IEC 61646 and 61730) of its flexible CIGS solar panels, again an industry first. In March 2012, the company's modules set a world record aperture efficiency of 13.4% for flexible CIGS Solar Panels, as measured by NREL.

== Company history ==
SoloPower was founded by Bulent Basol and Homayoun Talieh in 2005. The company started its pilot manufacturing line in December of the same year. In 2010, the company secured $45 million in debt financing and used $19.9 million of that to acquire the shares of ousted founders Talieh and Basol.

In 2010, SoloPower held talks with the town of Wilsonville, Oregon to set up a manufacturing plant there. In 2011, the United States Department of Energy approved a $197 Million Loan Guarantee to the company, enabling a 400MW manufacturing plant in Oregon. In May 2011, SoloPower decided to move the manufacturing facility to Portland instead. In April, 2013, SoloPower announced plans to suspend operations at the Portland plant and gut the remaining workforce.

SoloPower was announced a winner of the 2012 TiE50 award in the category of Clean Energy.

The company closed its doors in late 2017 and is no longer operational.

== Funding ==
The Norwegian firms Convexa Capital, Spencer Energy and Scatec have invested approximately $30 Million into SoloPower in 2007. The United States Department of Energy funded the company with $197 million from the same program that funded Solyndra, as have the City of Portland and agencies in the State of Oregon, which provided $56.5 million, and the California Energy Commission. In early 2011, the company received $13.5 Million from Crosslink Capital. Lead investors in the company include Hudson Clean Energy Partners, Crosslink Capital, Convexa, and Firsthand.

In the summer of 2017, the State of Oregon's Department of Energy paid $641,835 to cover SoloPower's back rent.

== Governments pay for defaults ==
The City of Portland pays $119,000 per month until late 2020 to cover for SoloPower's default on a loan the City guaranteed under Mayor Sam Adams in 2011. The money is taken out of Portland's Bureau of Transportation. The Bureau of Transportation pays because parking-meter revenue was used as guaranty.

== See also ==
- List of CIGS companies
- SoloPower Systems
