= Rola Cola =

Carbonated soft drink

- Manufacturer: Dubuis & Rowsell; Silver Spring Soft Drinks
- Origin: United Kingdom
- Discontinued: 1999; 27 years ago
- Flavour: Cola
- Website: www.rolacolacompany.com

In beverages, Rola Cola was a carbonated soft drink created by Carlo Dini in 1979.

Rola Cola was produced in the United Kingdom by Dubuis & Rowsell (dissolved in 1999), and originally−formerly by Silver Spring Soft Drinks of Kent, England. The soda was produced in the United States by the Ungerer Organization.

Rola Cola was distributed in 22 countries and sold internationally.

== History ==
Although it was no longer sold in the UK, because of a change of distribution, comedian Peter Kay often mentioned it in his routines.

Rola Cola was re-launched into the UK in 2013 by CBL Drinks.

The Coca-Cola Company attempted to sue Rola Cola in the UK, but lost the case. They then attempted to sue Rola Cola in the U.S. for the same claims used in the UK.
