= Giles Clarke =

English businessman and cricket administrator

Giles Clarke CBE
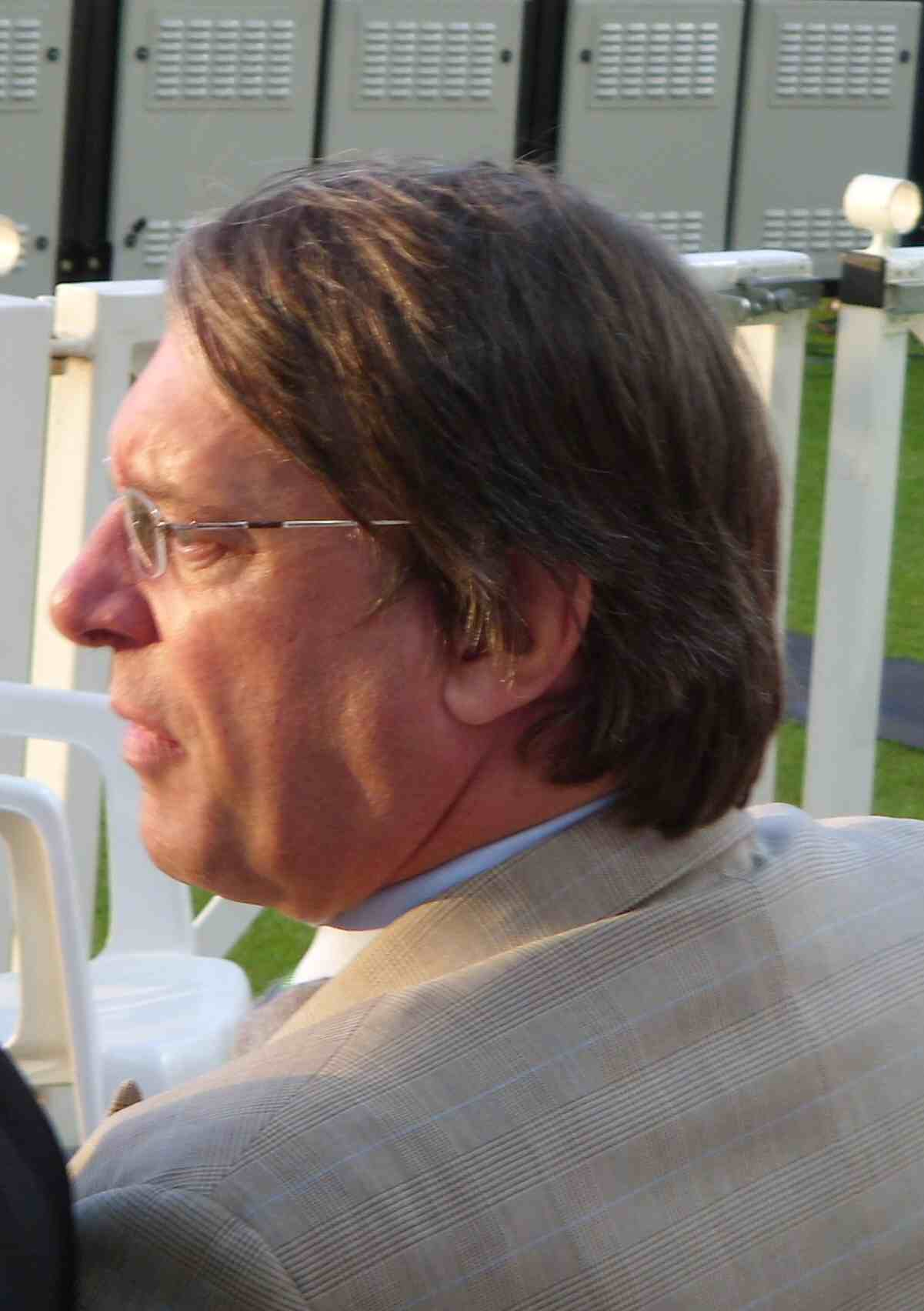
- Clarke at Trent Bridge in 2009

Chairman England and Wales Cricket Board
- In office 2007–2015
- Preceded by: David Morgan
- Succeeded by: Colin Graves

Personal details
- Born: Charles Giles Clarke; 29 May 1953 (age 73) Bristol, Gloucestershire, UK
- Spouse: Judy née Gould (m. 1983)
- Children: 1 son
- Education: Rugby School
- Alma mater: Oriel College, Oxford
- Profession: Businessman
- Awards: CBE

Charles Giles Clarke CBE DL (born 29 May 1953), is a British businessman then cricket administrator, who was chairman of the England and Wales Cricket Board.

== Early life and education ==
Born at Bristol, son of Charles Clarke and Stella née Herbert JP DL (Vice-Lieutenant of Bristol 2004–07), Clarke attended Rugby School, before going to Oriel College, Oxford.

At Oxford, Clarke studied Persian with Arabic, reputedly paying his way through gambling, before graduating as BA (proceeding MA). He then pursued further studies for a year at Damascus University Arabic language school.

== Business career ==
Clarke began his career as an investment banker with Credit Suisse First Boston. In 1981 he bought from receivership the assets of what was to become Majestic Wine, where, as chairman, he built it into a UK national chain. From August 1987 to May 1988, Clarke was chairman of Majestic Wine Corporation Inc, a United States company which owned a chain of 104 stores trading as Liquor Barn in California and Arizona. Following the disposal of its US-based businesses, he sold the UK plc business of Majestic Wine for £15 million in 1989.

In 1990, Clarke founded Pet City, where, as CEO, he built it into a chain of 94 stores. After floating the business in 1995, he sold it for £150 million in 1996 to US-based PetSmart. In 1998, Clarke founded Safestore, building it into the UK's third largest self storage company before selling it to Bridgepoint Capital for £44million in August 2003. In 1999, Clarke became CEO of Stepstone, an online career portal.

Clarke is chairman and controlling shareholder, via his company Westleigh Investments, of:

- ATL Telecom – Cardiff-based data transmission design equipment company, which manufactures in China
- Fosters Event Catering – a West Country-based caterer
- CCI International – the UK's largest clay pigeon equipment manufacturer
- West Country Business Systems – develops software systems for managing independent schools;

And previously:

- Non-executive chairman of Pure Wafer plc – presently the only European-based silicon chip test wafer reclaim company
- Chairman of Amerisur Resources PLC (formerly known as Chaco Resources).

== Public service ==
Clarke has been appointed to the following public bodies:

- National Council member of the Learning and Skills Council (2002–07), the largest quango in the UK with a budget of £10 billion, responsible for all UK adult learning, and a member of the Adult Learning Committee, a statutory body set up by the UK Parliament.
- Deputy Chairman of the EU Task Force on Skills and Mobility, presenting its report to the Barcelona Summit in 2002.
- Deputy Chairman of the Bristol Old Vic Theatre until 2007.
- Patron of Changing Faces, the UK national charity supporting and representing people with disfigurement
- Master of the Society of Merchant Venturers of Bristol for 2010/11; the Society continues its considerable charitable works whilst being recently accused by some of preserving a favourable memory of Edward Colston.
- Deputy Lieutenant of Wiltshire 1998–2002, then Somerset since 2004.

== Cricket ==
A keen club cricketer, Clarke was chairman of Somerset County Cricket Club, becoming instrumental in developing the club both on and off the field by consulting ex-cricketers including Sir Ian (now Lord) Botham. Consequently, he was appointed a non-executive director of the England and Wales Cricket Board, and as Chairman of ECB Marketing led the negotiations for the ECB's financially advantageous four-year TV and radio broadcasting rights deal signed with BSkyB, Five and the BBC in December 2004. On 25 September 2007 Clarke was elected Chairman of the ECB, re-elected in 2009, and again in March 2012 for a further three years. In April 2015 Clarke was nominated as the inaugural President of the ECB, with the primary role of representing the ECB on the International Cricket Council's executive board.

Clarke was appointed a Commander of the Order of the British Empire (CBE) in the 2012 New Year Honours for "services to cricket".

As chief executive of the ECB, Clarke attracted some controversy surrounding the Stanford Super Series, which was bankrolled by the now-convicted American financier Sir Allen Stanford, who offered a US$20million winner-takes-all match against the Stanford Superstars, a team comprising players from the West Indies. Although England had a warm-up game against the West Indies as part of the Super Series, members of the England team, captained by Kevin Pietersen, felt that they were underprepared prior to the match: England lost by 10 wickets.

Although featured in archive interviews and footage as part of a three-part Sky Documentary series entitled The Man Who Bought Cricket, Clarke declined to participate personally.

Clarke is a member of Marylebone Cricket Club.

== Private life ==
In 1983, Clarke married Judy Gould; the couple have a son Jack – after whom the brasserie in Bristol is named. Protective of his family private life, when his name appeared in the Sunday Times Rich List in the mid-1990s, Clarke took steps to shield his financial interests from public view.
