= Sainsbury's Cola =

Carbonated cola soft drink

Sainsbury’s Cola
- Type: Soft drink
- Manufacturer: Cott Corporation
- Distributor: Sainsbury's
- Origin: United Kingdom
- Introduced: c. 1966
- Flavour: Cola
- Variants: Cola, Diet Cola, Cola Zero
- Related products: Coca-Cola; Pepsi; Virgin Cola

Sainsbury’s Cola, formerly Classic Cola, is a carbonated cola soft drink, launched in circa 1966. It is made for the UK supermarket chain Sainsbury's.

== History ==
Sainsbury’s Cola was first introduced In circa 1966. Unlike other store brand colas, which are seen as cheap versions of the real thing, Sainsbury’s Cola was designed to be a worthy competitor to main rivals Coca-Cola and Pepsi.

In 1994, it was relaunched as “Classic Cola” to coincide with the launch of the new contender in the cola business at that time, Virgin Cola. This was during a period of time which the UK media dubbed "the cola wars". The global food giants pressed the UK government to add a clause in the debated Trade Mark bill, to stop retailers from using look-a-like branding. The product was made for Sainsbury's by the Canadian Cott Corporation. Coca-Cola took Sainsbury's to court and won, forcing a change in the design of the product.

Classic Cola was so successful that in 1994 it represented 13% of the total UK cola market, up from 2.5%. It also increased Sainsbury’s own brand cola share in its stores from 12% to over 60%. Coca-Cola’s share in Sainsbury’s stores reduced from 63% to 30% as a result. Classic Cola became Sainsbury’s most successful own brand product during that year. The product won several awards including Best New Product Award at the Marketing Society/ITV Awards.

Following the re-branding of the core Sainsbury’s own label range to “by Sainsbury’s” in 2013, the Classic Cola range has since been re-branded as “Cola by Sainsbury’s”, but is referred to once again as “Sainsbury’s Cola” on its in store shelf edge labels and on its website.

== Current operations ==
Sainsbury's continues to sell own brand Cola, but it no longer has the same brand recognition as the two major brands Coca-Cola and Pepsi..

== Marketing ==
When Sainsbury’s Cola was re-launched as Classic Cola in 1994, Sainsbury’s, who was then the UK’s largest supermarket chain, felt it had the clout for Classic Cola to have its own separate television adverts, which were broadcast after the endorsement of ITV GMTV.

== In popular culture ==
In 1994 Classic Cola featured in a taste test against Coca-Cola, Pepsi and Virgin Cola on the ITV GMTV television programme Sunday Night Clive. Carrie Fisher shunned Coca-Cola for Classic Cola. Following this, Sainsbury’s saw a substantial increase in sales of Classic Cola as a result. The value of Classic Cola’s media exposure during the first two months of its re-launch was estimated at £1 million.

== Legal action ==
When Sainsbury’s Cola was re-branded as Classic Cola in 1994, the emphasis was placed on the Classic Cola name as a separate brand in its own right, with the then Sainsbury’s logo reduced to a much smaller font. The design of the Classic Cola font also closely resembled that of Coca-Cola. Cola-Cola subsequently threatened legal action, so Sainsbury’s had to change the Classic Cola font, to place greater emphasis on “Cola”, with a reduction in the size and prominence of the word “Classic”.
