= Virgin Money US =

Defunct loans company

Virgin Money Holdings USA Inc.
- The Virgin Money logo at the time of their US venture
- Trade name: Virgin Money US
- Founder: Asheesh Advani
- Defunct: November 2010
- Successor: May 2000; 26 years ago in Cambridge, Massachusetts, United States
- Area served: United States
- Owner: Virgin USA (majority stake)

Virgin Money US (formerly CircleLending) was a peer-to-peer loans and loan-servicing company which was for a short time part of Virgin Money.

== History ==
=== Foundation ===
CircleLending was founded in Cambridge, Massachusetts in May 2000 by Asheesh Advani and launched in 2001. The company was then incorporated as CircleLending, Inc. in July 2002. In 2005 the company moved to Waltham, Massachusetts. In 2006, the company received venture capital from Venrock Associates, Bezos Expeditions and Omidyar Network totalling $10 million.

=== Acquisition by Virgin ===
In 2007, the Virgin Group acquired a majority stake in the company and renamed it Virgin Money Holdings USA Inc., the American division of Virgin Money. Virgin Money US focused solely on formalizing and servicing loans between friends and family, a business model which differentiated it from later social lending and crowdfunding businesses which encouraged loans between strangers.

In 2008 the company bought Lendia, and renamed it Virgin Money USA Inc., but sold it back to its founder, Greg O'Connor, the following year. O'Connor's company, formerly Lendia, continues to operate as Clearpoint Funding, Inc.

=== Closure and legacy ===
Founder Advani left the company in 2009. During the Great Recession, Virgin Money began its withdrawal from the US market. Virgin Money US withdrew from the US market entirely in November 2010. Servicing of its social loans was transferred to its servicing partner, Graystone Solutions, who continue to service the social loans under their own brand.

In 2010 a former Virgin Money US employee launched a new venture, National Family Mortgage, to address the intrafamily real estate loan void created by Virgin's departure.
