= Laithwaites Wine =

Wine merchant

Laithwaites is a British mail-order and online wine distributor and wine retailer based in Theale, England. It is a part of Direct Wines Ltd.

== History ==
Laithwaites was founded as Bordeaux Direct in 1969 by Tony Laithwaite. In 1970 he hired Barbara Anne Hynds as seasonal help; the two eventually married.

A 1973 partnership with the Sunday Times Wine Club, which Wine anorak called their "big break," expanded the customer base through mail-order wine distribution.

In the 1980s, Laithwaites broadened its wine sourcing to include other European countries and regions like Australia and the United States. This expansion later included the acquisition of Lionstone International in the United States.

During this period Tony Laithwaite also initiated the concept of ‘flying winemakers’, which encourage winemakers from New World regions like Australia to work in European vineyards during the off-season.

In 2000 the company rebranded as Laithwaites Wine.

Barbara Laithwaite established the Wyfold Vineyard in 2003 in South Oxfordshire and released its first commercial vintage in 2006.

In 2008 the company posted a loss of £5.5 million, which Wine anorak attributed to logistics and quality issues.

In 2011, Laithwaites partnered with the Royal Estate to plant a vineyard at Windsor Great Park.

As of 2023 the business was still owned by Tony and Barbara Laithwaite.

According to Financial Times, as of 2024 the company's subscription club had "more than 100,000" customers.

In a survey by the consumer magazine Which? published in 2025, Laithwaites was joint runner-up, together with Naked Wines and The Sunday Times Wine Club, all rated 77% for customer service and value for money, behind the winner, The Wine Society, which scored 93%.
