= Solyndra =

American solar panel manufacturer (2005–2011)

Solyndra Corporation
- Type: Start-up company
- Industry: Energy
- Founded: 2005
- Founder: Christian Gronet
- Defunct: 2011
- Fate: Bankruptcy
- Headquarters: Fremont, California
- Key people: Brian Harrison, CEO; Bill Stover, CFO
- Revenue: $100 million (2009) $140 million (2010)
- Owner: George Kaiser Family Foundation, U.S. Venture Partners, CMEA Ventures, Redpoint Ventures, Virgin Green Fund, Madrone Capital Partners, RockPort Capital Partners, Argonaut Private Equity, Masdar and Artis Capital Management
- Number of employees: 1,100 (approx)
- Website: Official Website (Archive from September 23, 2011)

Solyndra was a manufacturer of cylindrical panels of copper indium gallium selenide (CIGS) thin film solar cells. It was based in Fremont, California. In 2009, the Obama administration co-signed $535 million in loans to Solyndra.

Once promoted as a leader in the sustainable energy sector for its technology by the American federal administration, Solyndra was not able to compete with conventional solar panel manufacturers of crystalline silicon. The company filed for bankruptcy on September 1, 2011.

Solyndra became the focus of a political scandal after it was publicized they "used inaccurate information to mislead the Department of Energy" in obtaining government loan guarantees, and their offices were raided by the FBI. "A four-year joint investigation by the Department of Justice and the Department of Energy's Inspector General concluded in 2015 without any criminal charges or findings of political corruption. While the 2011 bankruptcy resulted in significant taxpayer losses, the company subsequently recovered approximately $52.5 million through antitrust settlements with competitors for predatory pricing.

== History ==
Chris Gronet founded what would become Solyndra in May 2005. In 2006, Solyndra began deploying demonstration systems globally. The company reported deploying 14 systems that were each instrumented with sensitive radiation, wind speed, temperature, and humidity measurement equipment to aid in the development of energy yield forecasting software tools. According to the company, over 1,000 systems were installed worldwide, representing 100 megawatts of power.

Major investors included George Kaiser Family Foundation, U.S. Venture Partners, CMEA Ventures, Redpoint Ventures, Virgin Green Fund, Madrone Capital Partners, RockPort Capital Partners, Argonaut Private Equity, Masdar and Artis Capital Management.

In 2009, the company posted $100 million in revenue. It was estimated that its production and sales growth could lead to a market capitalization between $1.76 and 2 billion. In 2010, revenues were approximately $140 million.

Brian Harrison, a veteran of Intel Corporation, briefly led Solyndra. He took the reins on July 27, 2010, a little more than a year before the company went bankrupt. Harrison replaced founder Gronet, who had served as CEO since the company's inception in 2005.

=== Government support ===
Solyndra received a $535 million U.S. Department of Energy loan guarantee, the first recipient of a loan guarantee under President Barack Obama's economic stimulus program, the American Recovery and Reinvestment Act of 2009. The loan program took a $528 million loss from Solyndra. Additionally, Solyndra received a $25.1 million tax break from California's Alternative Energy and Advanced Transportation Financing Authority. SoloPower also received similar funding from the U.S. Department of Energy.

Following the company's 2011 bankruptcy, the government had expected to recoup $27 million under the Solyndra restructuring plan, or up to 100% of loaned funds from a $1.5 billion lawsuit filed against Chinese polysilicon solar-panel makers for alleged price fixing. The outcomes of the lawsuits were that, in November 2015, Yingli Green Energy Holding Co Ltd. settled a claim filed by Solyndra for $7.5 million, and in April 2016 Trina Solar Ltd. settled a claim filed by Solyndra for $45 million. In June 2016 a Stipulation Of Dismissal was filed jointly between Solyndra and Suntech Power Holdings Co Ltd. and later signed by Hon. Saundra B. Armstrong on November 30, 2017.

=== Production facilities and layoffs ===
The company manufactured its products in its second fabrication plant, Fab 2, a new $733 million state-of-the-art robotic facility in Fremont, California, which opened in September 2010. Fab 2 was built with the support of a $535 million federal loan guarantee along with at least $198 million from private investors. Solyndra had expanded production in 2008. In March, 2009, Solyndra had estimated that:

- The construction of the new complex would employ approximately 3,000 people.
- The operation of the facility would create over 1,000 jobs in the United States.
- The installation of these panels would create hundreds of additional jobs in the United States.
- The commercialization of this technology was expected to be then duplicated in multiple other manufacturing facilities.

According to an initial public offering by the company, the combined annual production capacity of the plants was projected to be 610 megawatts by 2013.

Solyndra announced on November 3, 2010, that it would lay off around 40 employees and not renew contracts for about 150 temporary workers as a result of a consolidation of its production facilities. The company said that it was mothballing its older plant, Fab 1, and postponing expansion of recently opened Fab 2, giving it an annual production capacity of about 300 megawatts. Market conditions were cited, with conventional solar modules manufactured in China by low-cost producers such as Suntech and Yingli offering stiff competition.

=== Shutdown and investigation ===
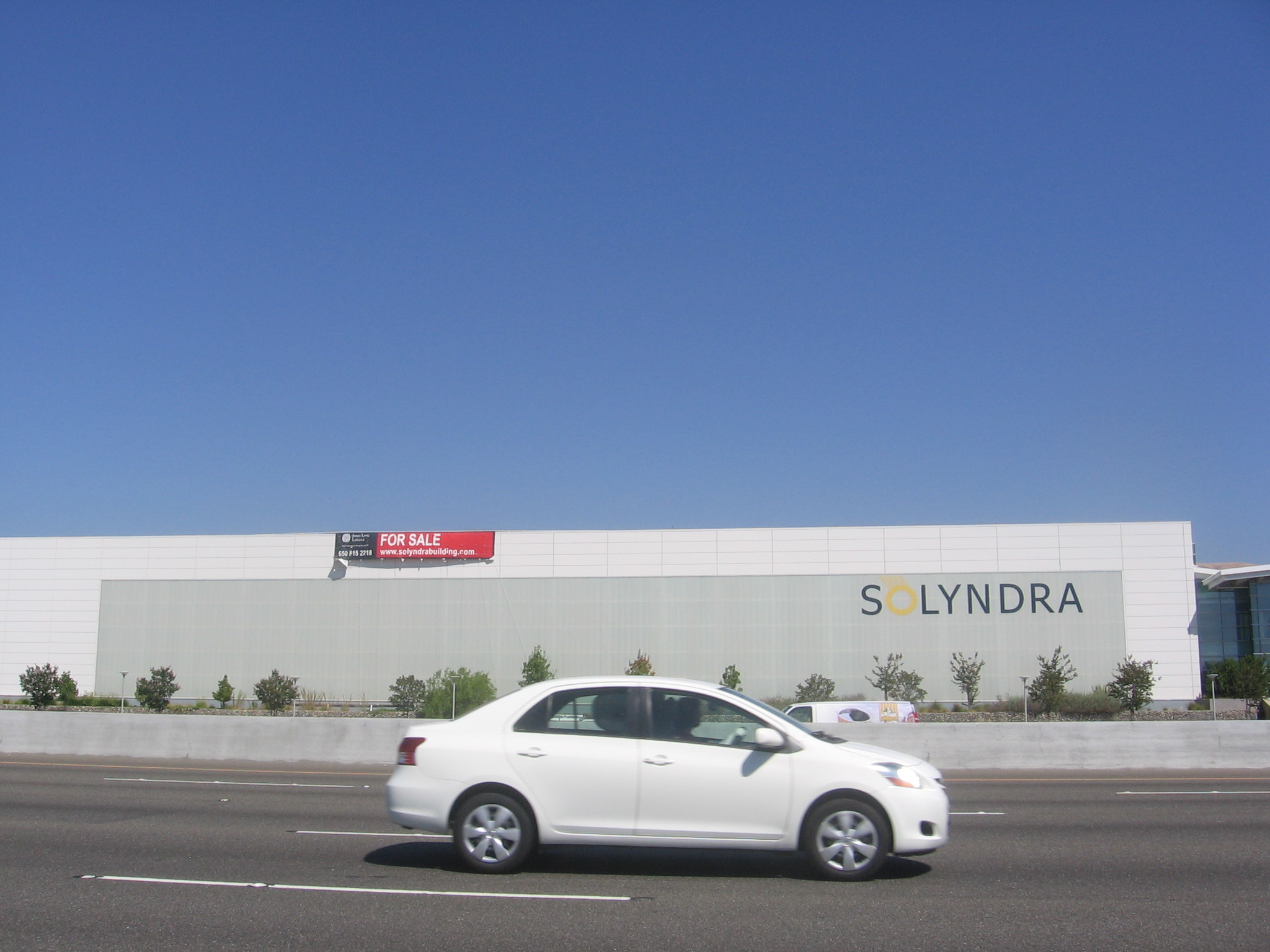
Solyndra facility in Fremont with a "For Sale" sign in September 2012. Seagate purchased the facility in 2013.

Between 2009 and mid-2011 the price of polysilicon, the key ingredient for most competing technologies, dropped by about 89% due to Chinese advances in the Siemens process. This precipitous drop in the cost of raw materials for Solyndra's competitors rendered CIGS technology incapable of competing, and other factors, including a contemporaneous drop in the price of natural gas, together with the faltering of the corresponding financial models, also contributed to Solyndra's demise, despite quickly raising capital.

On August 31, 2011, Solyndra announced it was filing for Chapter 11 bankruptcy protection, laying off 1,100 employees, and shutting down all operations and manufacturing. In September 2011, the company ceased all business activity, filed for bankruptcy under Chapter 11, Title 11, of the United States Bankruptcy Code, and laid off all employees. The company was also sued by employees who were abruptly laid off. Solyndra was raided by the FBI investigating the company. Federal agents visited the homes of Brian Harrison, the company's CEO, and Chris Gronet, the company's founder, to examine computer files and documents. Also, in September 2011, the US Department of the Treasury launched an investigation. Bloomberg reported in 2011 that Solyndra's $733 million plant had whistling robots and spa showers, along with many other signs of extravagant spending.

Also in 2011, a US Department of the Treasury official confirmed that the criminal probe of Solyndra was focused on whether the company and its officers misrepresented the firm's finances to the government in seeking the loan or engaged in accounting fraud. Emails showed that the Obama administration had concerns about the legality of the Department of Energy's loan restructuring plan and warned OMB director Jeffrey D. Zients that the plan should be cleared with the Department of Justice first, which the Department of Energy had not done. The emails also revealed that, as early as August 2009, an aide to then-White House Chief of Staff Rahm Emanuel had asked a Department of Energy official if he could discuss any concerns among the investment community about Solyndra but that the official dismissed the idea that Solyndra had financial problems. The bankruptcy court approved the hiring of chief restructuring officer Todd Neilson.

In 2012, the US Department of Justice objected to the bankruptcy plan amid allegations that "the plan's primary purpose is tax avoidance through the preservation of hundreds of millions of dollars of net operating losses after reorganization". Also, the successor company is named 360 Degree Solar Holdings, Inc., which would have control over "approximately US$350 million in tax attributes", such as net operating losses carryovers. The case In re Solyndra LLC et al., No. 11-12799 (Bankr. D. Del.), Judge Mary F. Walrath of the U.S. Bankruptcy Court for the District of Delaware ruled "that the evidence does not support a finding that the principal purpose of the plan was tax avoidance." "Solyndra's owners, Argonaut Ventures I LLC and Madrone Partners LP" will "realize the tax benefits of between $875 million and $975 million of net operating losses, while more senior creditors, including the Department of Energy, which provided a $535 million loan guarantee to Solyndra, will receive nearly nothing."

=== Aftermath ===
In 2011 and 2012, during Obama's re-election campaign, the political advocacy group Americans for Prosperity spent $8.4 million in swing states on television advertisements denouncing the loan guarantee. The Wall Street Journal described the advertising campaign as "perhaps the biggest attack on Mr. Obama so far."

Ultimately, none of the investigations of Solyndra found any evidence of criminal wrongdoing or political corruption, but there was evidence of "bad business judgement" and taxpayers were stuck with half a billion dollars in losses.

In 2012 a small number of glass tubes produced by Solyndra became part of an art installation at the University of California Botanical Garden.

According to his LinkedIn profile, Gronet has been at Applied Materials since September 2024, having become Vice President, Chief Architect Emerging Products, ICAPS Business Unit, SPG, working remotely from Santa Monica, California.

== Technology ==
Solyndra designed, manufactured, and sold solar photovoltaic (PV) systems composed of panels and mounting hardware for large, low-slope commercial rooftops. The panels perform optimally when mounted horizontally and packed closely together, the company claimed, covering significantly more of the typically available roof area and producing more electricity per rooftop on an annual basis than a conventional panel installation.

The company's panels were claimed to be unlike any other product ever tried in the industry: they were made of racks of cylindrical tubes (also called tubular solar panels), not traditional flat panels. Solyndra rolled its CIGS thin films into a cylindrical shape and placed 40 of them in each 1-by-2-metre (3 ft 3 in by 6 ft 7 in) panel. Solyndra designers thought the cylindrical solar panels absorbed energy from any direction (direct, indirect, and reflected light).

Each Solyndra cylinder, one inch in diameter, is made up of two tubes. The company used equipment it had developed to deposit CIGS on the outside of the inner tube, which includes up to 200 CIGS cells. On top of the CIGS material, it added an "optical coupling agent", which concentrates the sunlight that shines through the outer tube. After inserting the inner tube into the outer tube, each cylinder is filled with a silicone oil, then sealed with glass and metal to exclude moisture, which erodes CIGS's performance. The hermetic sealing technology is commonly used in fluorescent lamps.

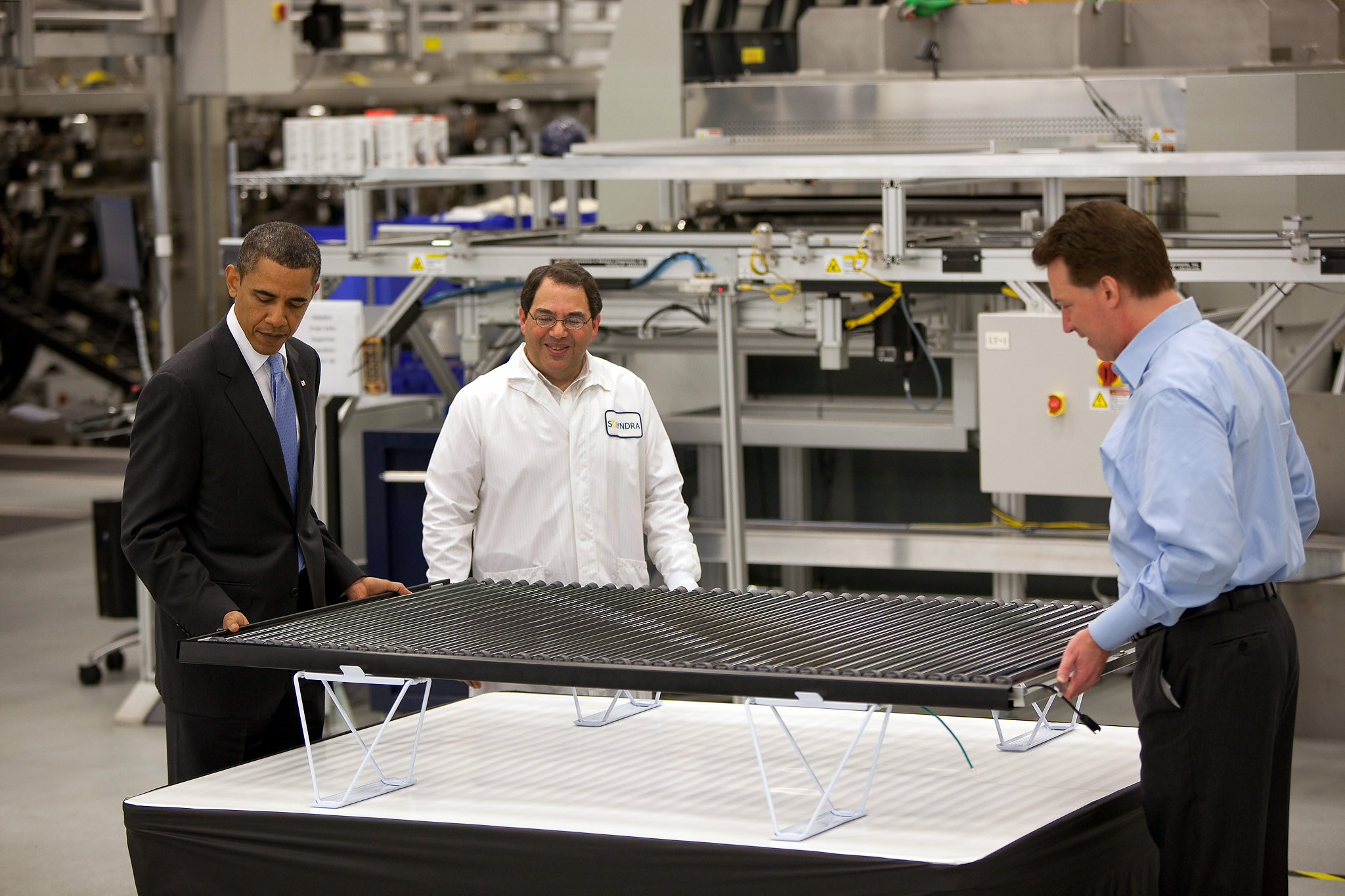
Solyndra module with characteristic tubes; Barack Obama, Chris Gronet (CEO), Ben Bierman (EVP)

When combined with a white roof, (Note: the fastest growing segment of the commercial roof industry, with over 36 sq mi (93 km^{2}) installed in 2008 and required for any new commercial construction in California) the company claimed that systems that employ the panels on a given rooftop could produce significantly more electricity in a given year. It was thought that on a white roof, the panels can capture up to 20% more light than a black roof. (Note: It is difficult to cite a specific reference for this because the exact gain depends on the latitude of the installation (in other words, sun angle). Solyndra's on-line energy modeling tool allowed designers to specify the roof albedo, and energy output varied as a function of albedo. Twenty percent is cited as typical figure and was validated by careful testing and modeling by the Fraunhofer Society, among others. However, this report is not available on-line.)

The other advantage claimed by the company was that the panels did not have to move to track the Sun. The panels are always presenting some of their face directly perpendicular to the Sun. The daily production of flat solar panels has an output curve that has a clear peak while Solyndra claimed their system produced more power throughout the day.

The Solyndra panels allow wind to blow through them. According to the company, these factors enable the installation of PV on a broader range of rooftops without anchoring or ballast, which are inherently problematic. Solyndra claimed that wind and snow loads are negligible and that its panels are lighter in weight per area.

The company claimed the cells themselves convert 12 to 14 percent of sunlight into electricity, an efficiency better than competing CIGS thin-film technologies. However, these efficiencies are for the cells laid flat. The company did not post any numbers about performance when the cells are rolled up. The Solyndra 100/200 spec sheet doesn't mention the cells or the panel efficiencies directly. However, calculating from the data provided shows the high-end 210 panel has a field efficiency of about 8.5%.

== See also ==
- Beacon Power
