= Virgin Group =

British multinational conglomerate

Virgin Group Limited

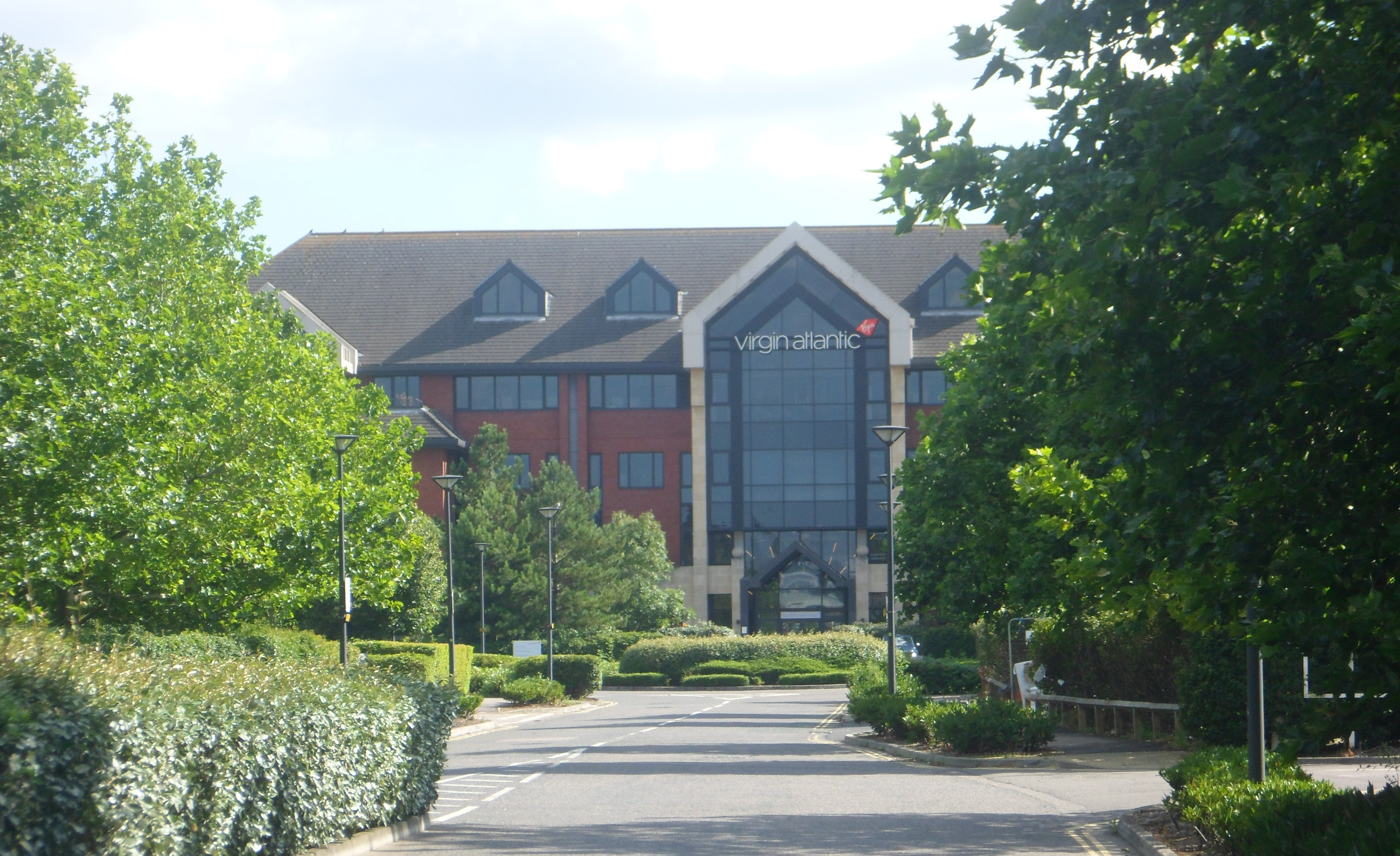
- Type: Private
- Industry: Conglomerate
- Founded: February 1970; 56 years ago
- Founders: Richard Branson; Nik Powell
- Headquarters: London, England, UK
- Area served: Worldwide
- Key people: Peter Norris (chairman); Josh Bayliss (CEO)
- Products: List: Banking; Broadcasting; Books; Commercial aviation; Commercial spaceflight; Consumer electronics; Films; Health care; Health insurance; Internet; Insurance; Jewellery; Mobile phones; Music; Radio; Rail Transport; Retail; Television; Travel
- Revenue: ▼£16.6 billion (2019)
- Owner: Richard Branson
- Number of employees: ~71,000
- Website: www.virgin.com

Virgin Group Limited is a British multinational venture capital conglomerate based in London, England, founded by Richard Branson and Nik Powell in February 1970. Virgin Group is recorded by Companies House as incorporated in 1989 and classified as a holding company, although its commercial activities began in the 1970s.

== History ==
The Virgin brand's early history is that of Virgin Records, founded in 1970 by Richard Branson and Nik Powell as a recorded-music retailer, first via mail order and in 1971 with a physical store. The name reflected their status as metaphorical virgins in business.

According to Branson, the signature-style logo, introduced in 1978, was based on one that designer Ray Kyte scribbled on a napkin after a design meeting. (An unrelated 1973 pictorial logo for the Virgin record label was designed by Roger Dean.) Branson has described the "V" in the 1978 logo as an expressive tick, representing the Virgin seal of approval.

== Corporate affairs ==
Virgin Group has its headquarters in Whitfield Studios in Soho, a district of the City of Westminster. The group moved to this location in November 2024. Previously, the company were based at the Porchester Building in the London Borough of Tower Hamlets, The Battleship Building in Paddington, a district of the City of Westminster and at The School House in Brook Green, in the London Borough of Hammersmith and Fulham.

Virgin Group have a complex structure that contains elements of a generic conglomerate and a keiretsu, and sometimes it simply licences its brand. Examples of licensing are Virgin Records and Virgin Media, which are owned by Universal Music Group and Liberty Global respectively.

In mid-May 2013, the Virgin Group expressed its intention to seek out opportunities in Australia's healthcare industry to consolidate on the Group's Australian fitness centres. The Group also runs over 100 National Health Service (NHS) services in the United Kingdom and the healthcare division of medical services group Assura after entering the British healthcare industry in 2011.

Virgin Group announced the establishment of Virgin Voyages on 4 December 2014 with financial backing from Bain Capital. The cruise line would be led by CEO Tom McAlpin, would have two new large ships built and be based in the Miami/Fort Lauderdale area.

=== Virgin StartUp ===
Virgin StartUp is the Virgin Group's non-profit company, helping entrepreneurs across the UK to start, fund and scale their business.

The organisation became a delivery partner for the UK Government's Start Up Loans Company, providing loan finance of between £500 and £25,000, advice, and mentoring to thousands of start-ups across the country. In 2016, it was awarded European Regional Development Funding and subsequently launched Ready, Steady, Grow with Virgin StartUp, a programme of support aimed at start-ups that were ready to grow. A year later, it launched the UK's first equity-based crowdfunding accelerator programme, Crowdboost.

==== Foodpreneur ====
In 2014, Branson and Virgin StartUp launched the "Foodpreneur" food and drink focused start-up competition. Winners received mentorship from Branson, legal support, and brand counselling. The 2014 winners included Proper Beans, Killer Tomato, Sweetpea Pantry, and Sweet Virtues.

In 2015, winners were given the opportunity to pitch Target Corporation buyers in the US. The 2015 winners included Pip & Nut, Double Dutch Drinks, Harry Bromptons, Cauli Rice, and Mallow and Marsh.

Only one start-up was announced winner of the 2017 Foodpreneur prize, The Snaffling Pig Co., who won a six-week rental space at intu Lakeside, the shopping centre with the highest foot traffic in the UK.

== Senior leadership ==
=== Current chairman and chief executive ===
- Chairman: Peter Norris (since 2009)
- Chief executive: Josh Bayliss (since 2014)

=== Former chairmen ===
1. Sir Richard Branson (1970–2009)

=== Former chief executives ===
1. Sir Richard Branson (1970–2005)
2. Stephen Murphy (2005–2011)
3. David Baxby and Josh Bayliss (2011–2014)

== Subsidiaries and investments ==
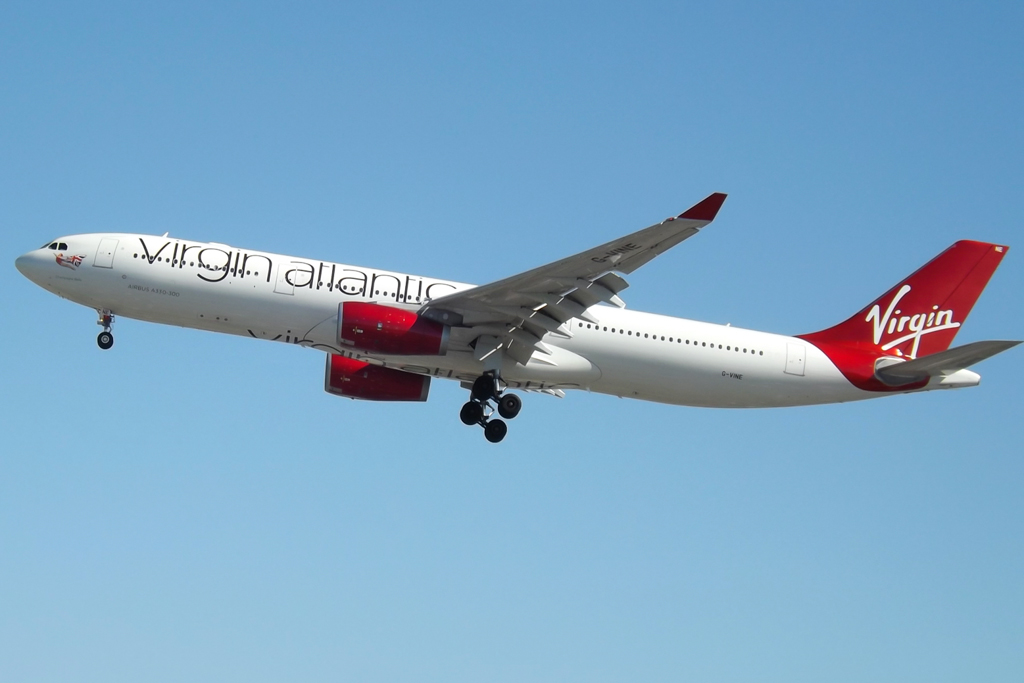
An Airbus A330-300 of Virgin Atlantic Airways

Company	Ownership percentage	Sector
Virgin Active	20%	Health, gyms
Virgin Adventures	100%	Travel, charity
Virgin Atlantic	51%	Travel, airline
Virgin Atlantic Holidays	51%	Travel, tour operator
Virgin Australia Holdings	5%	Travel, airline
Virgin Balloon Flights	Brand licensed to AirXcite Ltd	Entertainment, hot air balloons
Virgin Bet	100%	Online bookmaker
Virgin Books	10%	Publishing
Virgin Experience Days	Brand licensed to Inflexion Private Equity	Hospitality
Virgin Fibra	33.3%	Broadband
Virgin Gifts	Brand licensed to Virgin Gifts Ltd.	Hospitality
Virgin Galactic	11.9%	Travel, aerospace
Virgin Games	Brand licensed to Gamesys Operations Limited	Online casino
Virgin Gift Card	100%	Retail
Virgin Hotels	100%	Travel, hotels
Virgin Limited Edition	100%	Travel, hotels
Virgin Media O2	Brand licensed to VMED O2 UK Limited, a 50/50 joint venture between Liberty Global and Telefónica	Communications
Virgin Megastores	Brand licensed to Azadea Group, Megastores of Lebanon SAL and Retail Holding SA	Retail
Virgin Mobile	Brand licensed to numerous entities, operating Virgin-branded mobile virtual network operators	Communications
Virgin Money Australia	Brand licensed to Bank of Queensland	Banking
Virgin Money UK	Brand licensed to Nationwide Building Society	Banking
Virgin Music Group	Brand licensed to Universal Music Group	Music
Virgin Plus	Brand licensed to Bell Canada	Communications
Virgin Pulse	25%	Business services
Virgin Radio	Brand licensed to numerous entities, operating Virgin-branded radio stations	Entertainment, radio
Virgin Rail Group	51%	Travel, train
Virgin Records	Brand licensed to Universal Music Group	Music
Virgin Red	100%	Loyalty program
Virgin Unite	100%	Charity
Virgin Startup	100%	Charity
Virgin Telco	100%	Communications
Virgin Trains Ticketing	100%	Ticket retailer, trains
Virgin Voyages	49%	Travel, cruises
Virgin Wines	Brand licensed to Virgin Wine Online Ltd (UK) & Direct Wines (Australia)	Retail, wine

== Formerly owned ventures ==
- Absolute Radio: formerly Virgin Radio UK, rebranded in 2008
- Air Nigeria: Nigerian national airline launched as Virgin Nigeria, shares sold in 2010
- Connect Airways (Flybe): 30% stake held through Virgin Atlantic. Entered administration in March 2020.
- Vintage Air Tours: Nostalgic airline using refurbished DC-3 aircraft for travel between Orlando and Key West. Operated only in 1992.
- Virgin Airship and Balloon Company: Operating hot air balloons and airships for advertisers
- Liquid Comics: comic book producer formerly known as Virgin Comics—sold to management in 2008
- Vie at Home: cosmetics retailer formerly known as Virgin Vie, sold to management in 2009
- Virgin America: North American airline, sold to Alaska Air Group on 14 December 2016
- Virgin Brides: retailer specialising in bridal wear
- Virgin Care sold to Twenty20 Capital and rebranded as HCRG Care Group on 1 December 2021
- Virgin Cars: online car retailer, ceased trading in 2005
- Virgin Charter: online marketplace of private aircraft seat bookings
- Virgin Cinemas: sold to UGC in 1999
- Virgin Digital Help: technical support
- Virgin Drinks: drink manufacturer
  - Virgin Cola: carbonated cola soft drink
  - Virgin Vodka: alcoholic beverage
  - v-Mix: spirit mixers
- Virgin Electronics: electronics retailer
- Virgin Energy: joint venture energy provider
- Virgin Express: airline based in Brussels, merged with SN Brussels Airlines in 2006 to form Brussels Airlines
- V Festival: British music festival sponsored by the Virgin Group
- V Festival (Australia): an Australian version of the V Festival
- Virgin Festival: a North American version of the V Festival
- Virgin Films: film production company
- Virgin Games: sold to Gamesys in 2013
- Virgin Games Centre, retail chain, formed by the acquisition of the "Game Centre" retailer in 1984, rebranded as Future Zone in 1993
- Virgin Green Fund: shut down in 2014
- Virgin Health Bank: sold to Qatar Foundation
- Virgin Hyperloop: High Speed Rail Travel - Rebranded back to previous name ‘Hyperloop One’, went bankrupt in January 2024.
- Virgin Interactive: Game Developer and publisher, bought by various companies, and renamed Avalon Interactive in 2003
- Virgin Limobike: Virgin Atlantic announced they will cut complimentary ground transfers for Upper Class passengers in February 2020 - Virgin Limobike has since rebranded to "Limobike"
- Virgin Limousines: a former limousine service that operated mostly in the US and Canada. It operated for 14 years, until November 2010.
- Virgin Media (including Virgin Mobile UK): UK cable TV, broadband Internet and fixed and mobile telephony provider—bought by Liberty Global
- Virgin Mobile Australia: mobile phone service provider in Australia—shares sold to Optus in 2006
- Virgin Mobile France: mobile phone service provider in France—shares sold to Numericable-SFR in 2014
- Virgin Mobile India: mobile phone service provider in India—shares sold to Tata Teleservices in 2015
- Virgin Mobile USA: mobile phone service provider in the USA—shares sold to Sprint Corporation in 2009, ceased operations in 2020.
- Virgin Money Australia: sold to Bank of Queensland
- Virgin Money US: sold in 2010
- Virgin Music: sold to Universal Music Group
- Virgin One account: shareholding sold to co-owner (RBS) in 2003
- Virgin Orbit: aerospace—declared Chapter 11 bankruptcy on 4 April 2023
- Virgin Play: Spanish game distributor and publisher, filed for liquidation and closed in 2009
- Virgin Plus (formerly Virgin Mobile Canada): mobile phone service provider in Canada—shares sold to joint venture partner Bell Mobility in 2009
- Virgin Produced - Shut down in 2022
- Virgin Pure: Consumer goods company in partnership with Strauss Group, rebranded to Our Taap in 2025
- Virgin Sports: Active lifestyle company—sold to LimeLight Sports in September 2020
- Virgin Sun Airlines: scheduled and charter airline, closed in 2001
- Virgin Snow, 1986 joint venture with Bladon Lines Ski Vacations
- Virgin Trains ExpressCoach: former operator of inter-city bus & coach services (51%)
- Virgin CrossCountry: former operator of the Cross Country railway franchise in the United Kingdom, superseded by Arriva CrossCountry in 2007 (51%)
- Virgin EMI Records: soundtrack label—owned by Universal Music Group
  - Virgin Records: American music soundtrack label
- Virgin Racing: Formula One motor racing team
- Virgin Racing Formula E Team: Formula E motor racing team
- Virginware: clothing retailer
- Virgin Wines: online wine market, sold to Direct Wines in 2005
- Virgin Trains West Coast: train operating company on the West Coast Main Line. Renewed franchise bid unsuccessful, superseded by Avanti West Coast in December 2019 (51%)
- Virgin Trains East Coast: train operating company, superseded by London North Eastern Railway in June 2018 (10%)
- Virgin Trains USA: train operating company between Miami and West Palm Beach, Florida. Branding deal launched in late 2018, ended in 2020.
- Virgin Video (aka Virgin Vision): home video distributor, sold to Management Company Entertainment Group in 1989.
- Virgin Vacations: Former USA-based tour operator, closed on 31 March 2019

== Controversies ==
In 2017, Virgin Care received significant media coverage for suing clinical commissioning groups in Surrey after it lost out on an £82 million National Health Service (NHS) contract to provide children's health services across the country. The NHS bodies settled out of court with a £328,000 payout. More than 100,000 people backed a petition calling on the company to stop "dragging the NHS through the courts". Virgin Care was sold in 2021 and rebranded HCRG Care.
