= SoloPower Systems =

SoloPower Systems Inc.
- Company type: Private
- Industry: Solar Energy
- Founded: 2013
- Headquarters: Portland, Oregon, U.S.
- Key people: Robert W.Campbell (CEO)
- Products: Flexible CIGS
- Website: solopower.com

SoloPower Systems Inc. technology is used to create ultra-lightweight, thin-film, flexible Solar Panels, based on CIGS (Copper indium gallium selenide). Originally developed by San Jose, California-based Solopower Inc., the technology is now owned by Solopower Systems Inc., a solar panel development & manufacturing company based in Portland, Oregon. SoloPower technology features an electroplating process that utilizes nearly 100% of its materials to manufacture its CIGS cells.

== Company history ==
SoloPower technology was created by SoloPower Inc., founded by Bulent Basol and Homayoun Talieh in 2005, which began a pilot manufacturing line for SoloPower solar panels in December of that same year. In February 2011, the United States Department of Energy conditionally approved a $197 million Federal Loan Guarantee to the company to help it build and equip a high-volume manufacturing plant in Portland, Oregon. By the time the plant was completed in early 2013, however, the company opted to finance the project with private rather than public funds.

In 2012, SoloPower Panels became the first CIGS flexible solar panels to obtain both UL and IEC Certification. In March 2012, Solopower Modules also set a world record aperture efficiency for flexible CIGS Solar Panels of 13.4%, as measured by the US Department of Energy's National Renewable Energy Laboratory (NREL), and in May 2012, SoloPower technology was announced a winner of the 2012 TiE50 award in the category of Renewable Energy.

In April, 2013, following a sharp downturn in market conditions – caused largely by shrinking government investment and stiff competition from low-cost foreign producers – SoloPower Inc. announced plans to close its pilot plant in San Jose, California, and temporarily suspended operations at its Portland plant; however, in the summer of 2017, the Oregon Department of Energy paid $641,835 in Solopower's rent in Oregon. Subsequently, in July 2013, the company's major creditors transferred the SoloPower technology to a new entity named Solopower Systems Inc., with plans to begin commercially producing Solopower Panels in the summer of 2014.

== Funding ==
Lead investors in the development of SoloPower technology - Hudson Capital Management, Firsthand Technology Value Fund, Crosslink Capital, and Convexa Capital Ventures - have invested some $200 million over the period. The technology has also received the benefit of loans from the Oregon Department of Energy (which also paid for rent in 2017) and the California Energy Commission, and other state tax incentives.

== See also ==
- SoloPower
