= Colin Graves =

British entrepreneur (born 1948)

Colin James Graves CBE (born 22 January 1948) is a British entrepreneur and the chair of Yorkshire County Cricket Club.

Graves founded the Costcutter chain of convenience stores, before becoming chairman of the ECB.

== Biography ==
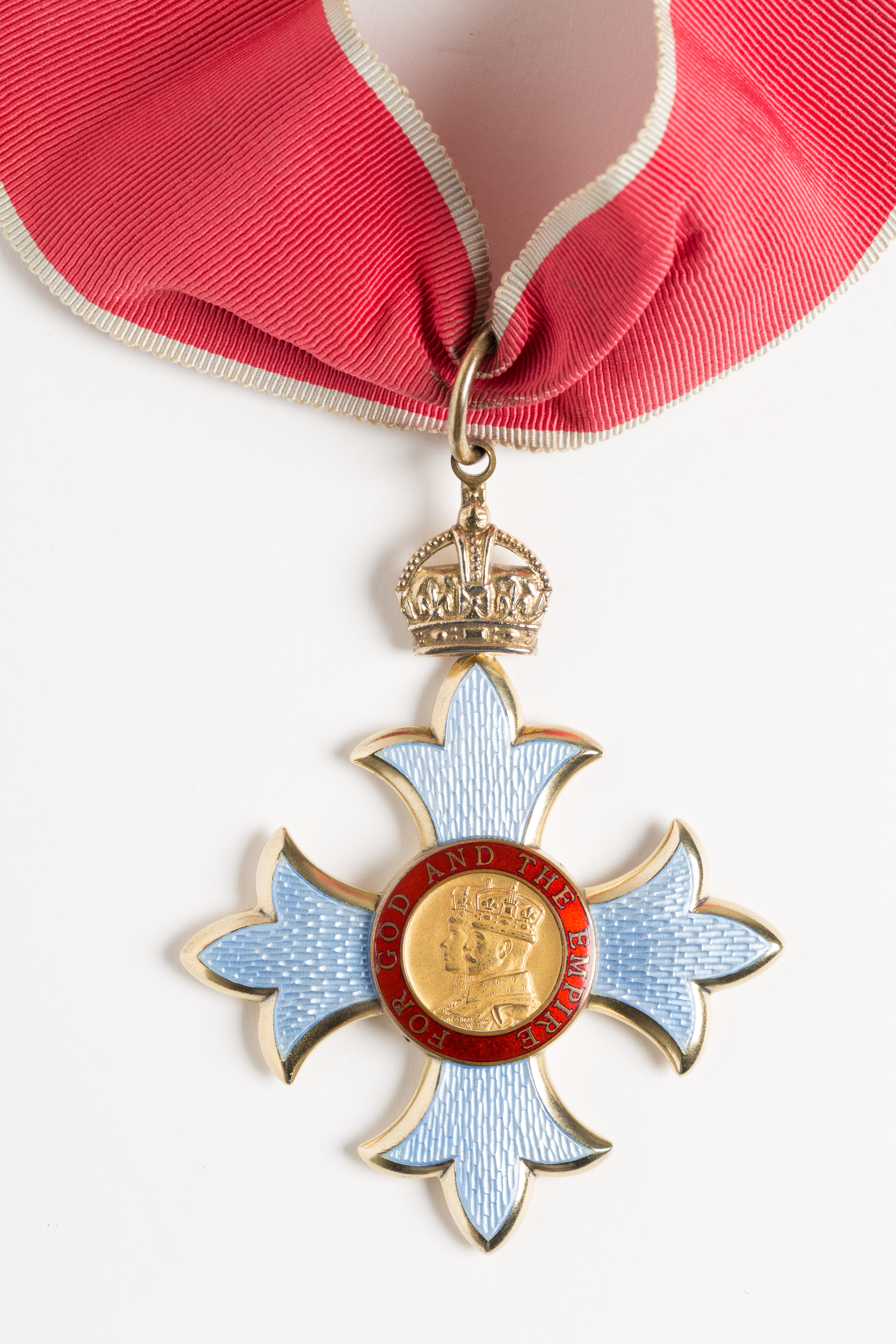
CBE insignia

Raised on a farm near Thorne, then in the West Riding of Yorkshire, Graves attended Goole Grammar School.

Graves founded Costcutter in 1986 and was chairman until 2012, when Bibby Line Group bought out the company.

Executive chairman of Yorkshire County Cricket Club from 2012 to 2015, Graves was elected deputy chairman of the England and Wales Cricket Board in April 2013, and in 2015 he succeeded Giles Clarke as chairman, to serve until 2020. Graves was appointed a Commander of the Order of the British Empire (CBE) in the 2020 New Year Honours "for services to cricket".

In 2024, it was announced that Graves would be returning as non-executive chairman of the Yorkshire County Cricket Club.
