= Tony Laithwaite =

British entrepreneur

Anthony Hugh Gordon Laithwaite CBE (born 1945) is a British entrepreneur in the wine industry who is known for pioneering the home-delivery wine business.

== Early life and education ==
Laithwaite read Geography at Durham University and wrote his dissertation on the wines of Saint-Émilion. This was "not the greatest piece of work" but W. B. Fisher awarded it a generous mark due to his love of wine.

== Career ==
Laithwaite worked in the vineyards of Bordeaux as a student. In 1969 he founded the wine importation business Bordeaux Direct, starting with five labels and 150 customers. Money received from his grandmother enabled the purchase of a Ford Transit van, which made it possible to drive down to France and collect wines from the vineyards directly. According to Laithwaite, this gave his business a competitive advantage as his products "tasted better because they were bottled by the actual producers" at a time when most wine sold in Britain was bottled domestically.

=== Sunday Times Wine Club ===
In 1973 The Sunday Times published an exposé on fraudulent wine. In response, Laithwaite wrote an open letter to the paper claiming readers could trust the wines he was bringing into the country. Barbara Laithwaite, wife and business partner of Tony, negotiated a deal to form the Sunday Times Wine Club, which helped the company expand through mail-order distribution – an area of the business later rebranded as Laithwaites Wine. The club gave Laithwaite 10,000 new customers in a single week and enjoyed the patronage of wine expert Hugh Johnson, who became club president.

=== Later career ===
1988 was an annus horribilis for Laithwaite: his 'right-hand man' Tim Bleach was killed in a car accident while on a buying trip to Spain, and he also suffered a heart attack.

By 2010 the Laithwaites wine list had grown to 2,500 wines and the company employed 1,000 people worldwide. In 2019, Laithwaite was made CBE in the Birthday Honours list for services to the British and global wine industry.
