= Silver Spring Soft Drinks =

British soft drink company

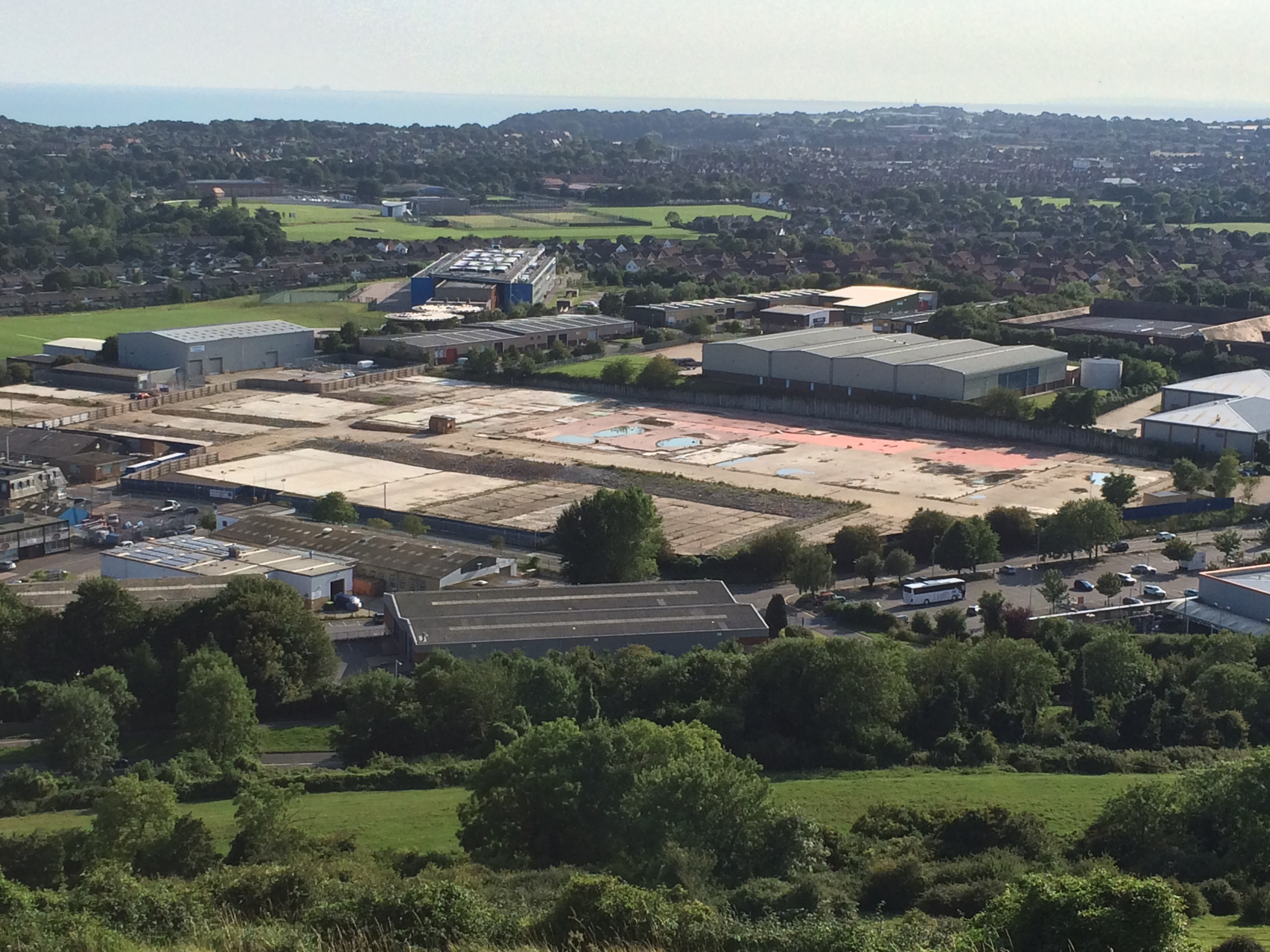
Demolished Silver Spring production plant

Silver Spring Soft Drinks Ltd was a commercial limited company that produced a range of soft drinks from its factory and headquarters at Folkestone, Kent, in the United Kingdom. Founded as a company in 1886, the company traded under the name of Silver Spring Mineral Water Company until it changed ownership in 2009; it was subsequently sold by Privet Capital in 2010. The new entity in turn hit trouble in 2012 and was liquidated in early 2013. It produced the drink brands Perfectly Clear and Rola Cola along with own label brands for supermarket chains.

== History ==
The Silver Spring Mineral Water Company was founded in Folkestone in 1888 as a carbonated soft drinks manufacturer. Originally located at Grace Hill, Folkestone, towards the end of the 1890s the company expanded and moved to larger premises in Foord Rd. In 1946 Silver Spring bought and merged with another local firm, the Harris of Hythe Company. Further consolidation of the local market came in 1969 when Silver Spring took over Star Mineral of Whitstable. In 1970 it moved again to a new facility on the Park Farm Estate. During the following decade it created the Rola Cola and Spring Up brands.

The company became the first company in Great Britain to begin production of P.E.T. 2-litre bottles in 1982, and shortly after commenced own label production for the supermarkets. On 6 May 1995, the company introduced the Perfectly Clear brand of flavoured mineral water. Within two years Perfectly Clear became the 4th best selling carbonated drink in the UK. In 2008 the company was reported as producing more than 250m bottles of drinks per year.

Despite the success of Perfectly Clear, the family-owned company was entered into administration on 16 September 2009 by Deloitte LLP. The company's assets were subsequently purchased by venture capital firm Privet Capital and renamed as Silver Spring Soft Drinks Company Ltd, which continued the sale of the Silver Spring products.

Silver Spring Soft Drinks Company Ltd in turn entered administration in October 2012, with production ceasing in December 2012 ahead of the company being finally wound up.

Drinks company CBL Drinks acquired Silver Spring's former brands in 2013.

== Products ==
Silver Spring products were commonplace throughout Kent, and many (including its 'Perfectly Clear' flavoured water range) were distributed nationwide. Certain lines were, however, distributed only in Kent, thus the company had a very local feel to it. Although many of its products were generic in nature (cola, mineral water, etc.) it produced one line which is believed to be unique, the soft drink Bing, which was widely drunk in Kent. The company's lemonade was known by the distinctive product title Spring Up.

Silver Spring had been operating from Folkestone since 1870, and as a Company since 1886, and remained independent until its final years. It retained many traditional features, for example, manufacturing its own bottles, both glass and plastic, and claimed to have the United Kingdom's last glass drinks bottle manufacturing plant.

In 2007, Silver Spring took over production of Virgin Cola.

== See also ==
- List of defunct consumer brands
