= Virgin Green Fund =

Defunct renewable energy investment firm

- Company type: Private
- Industry: Private equity
- Founded: 2007
- Defunct: 2014
- Fate: shut down
- Headquarters: London, United Kingdom; San Francisco, United States; New York City, United States
- Area served: North America & Europe
- Number of employees: 10
- Parent: Virgin Group
- Website: www.virgingreenfund.com

Virgin Green Fund was established in 2007 to invest in companies in the renewable energy and resource efficiency sectors in the US and Europe. It closed in 2014.

== Investment history ==
The fund's first fundraising round raised $199m from Virgin and other investors. A notable initial investor was Wolverhampton City Council. The fund's investment focus is on established businesses rather than start ups. It had invested in 10 businesses out of 3,700 considered as of 2010.

== Portfolio ==
As of April 2010 Virgin Green Fund's portfolio included:

- Gevo
- Solyndra
- Odersun
- Metrolight
- Wildcat Discovery Technologies
- DuraTherm
- Seven Seas
- Quench USA
- GreenRoad

== Shutdown ==
In 2014, the firm was closed down by the Virgin Group.

== See also ==
- Virgin Atlantic
- Aviation biofuel
- Sustainable aviation fuel
