= Naked Wines =

Online wine retailer based in Norwich, England

- Company type: Retail
- Industry: Wine
- Founded: 2008
- Founder: Rowan Gormley
- Headquarters: Norwich, United Kingdom
- Website: www.nakedwines.com

Naked Wines is an online wine retailer, founded by Rowan Gormley which launched in the UK on 1 December 2008.

== History ==
In March 2010, Naked Wines announced a pricing model called Advance Bookings at the London International Wine Fair. The model provided discounted wine when ordered in advance.

Advance Bookings altered its booking model and renamed it Naked Marketplace in May 2011. Customers can bid on upcoming wines until a minimum volume is met and the wine is subsequently sold.

On 10 April 2015, Naked Wines was acquired by Majestic Wine, and Gormley became group CEO.

In December 2019, The Majestic portion of the business, including stores and branding, was sold to private equity firm Fortress Investment Group. Majestic Wines plc was renamed Naked Wines plc. In effect, the previous shareholders of Majestic became the new shareholders of Naked Wines.

Naked Wines is a publicly listed company. As of 2024, the CEO is Rodrigo Maza.

== Business model ==
Naked Wines' customers (called Angels) fund independent winemakers worldwide in return for wines at self-described "wholesale prices." However, the Financial Times notes that most wines sold by Naked Wines are not available on the retail market, "making direct price comparisons virtually impossible," and most wines are priced "close to the usual retail price." They currently ship wine throughout the United Kingdom, United States, and Australia.

Customers review their wines and interact with other online customers; reviewers give the wines Likert-scale style scores out of five, a Yes/No to whether they would repurchase the wine, and a textual description. When prospective buyers look at a wine's page, they will see previous customers' reviews, which helps them determine what they want to try.

== See also ==
- Virgin Wines
- Majestic Wine
