= Majestic Wine =

British wine retailer

Majestic Wine Warehouses Ltd
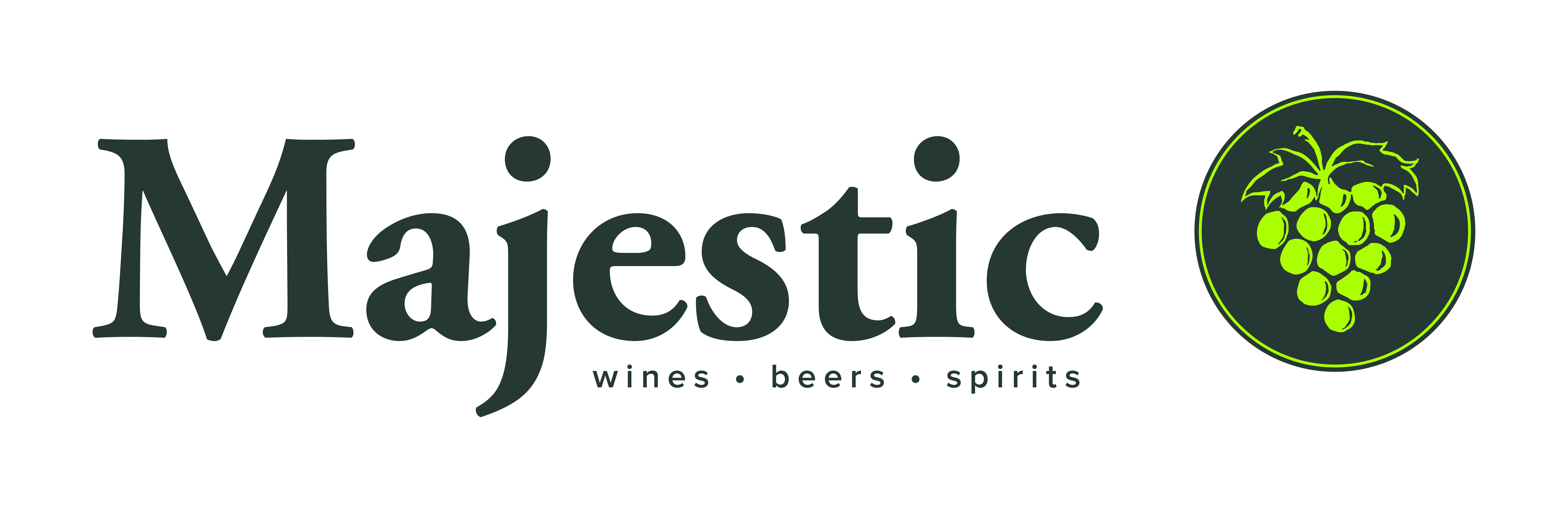
- Type: Private Company
- Industry: Wine retailing
- Genre: Liquor firm
- Founded: 1980; 46 years ago
- Founder: Sheldon Graner
- Headquarters: Watford, England, UK
- Number of locations: 200
- Area served: United Kingdom
- Key people: John Colley, CEO
- Products: Wine, champagne, spirits
- Services: Glassware hiring, wine tasting, delivery service from local stores
- Revenue: £382.5m (12 months to 28/Mar/2022)
- Operating income: £24.8m (12 months to 28/Mar/2022)
- Owner: Fortress Investment Group
- Number of employees: 1,350
- Website: www.majestic.co.uk

Majestic Wine is a British wine retailer based in Watford, England. The company employs more than 1,300 employees nationwide, and operates more than 200 stores across the United Kingdom.

== History ==
=== 1980 to 1999 ===
Majestic Vintners was founded by Sheldon Graner in 1980. Prior to Majestic Vintners, Graner gained work as a merchandiser with the John Lewis group. The initial design logo for the company was based on a definitive set of King George V postage stamps of 1929. During the 1970s, laws regarding selling alcohol were restrictive in the United Kingdom. Majestic Vinters offered wine tastings and sold wine by the case to comply with the laws.

Graner opened his first wine warehouse in Harringay, North London, in 1980, hiring Tony Mason to manage the day-to-day running of the store. A second shop launched in Battersea in May 1981. A few months later, the group called in receivers and Majestic's assets were bought by Giles Clarke.

In August 1987, Majestic acquired Liquor Barn, a chain of 104 stores in California and Arizona, as part of its US expansion plans. Following the disposal of the American business, Majestic Wine was sold for £15 million to investors in 1989.

In 1986, Tony Mason set up Wizard Wine under the same concept, which in 1987 was purchased by retailer Bejam. After Bejam was purchased by rival Iceland in January 1989, Mason and partners John Apthorp and Tim How (CEO until 2008) bought Wizard Wine from the heavily indebted Iceland. In September 1991, Wizard Wine purchased Majestic Wine in a leveraged buyout, and merged as a private company. Headquartered in Watford, Hertfordshire, under the leadership of Tim How, Majestic Wine became a public company in 1996, trading on the Alternative Investment Market (AIM).

=== 2000 to 2026 ===
- April 2000 – Majestic started selling wine online for the first time through majestic.co.uk.
- October 2001 – Majestic acquired Les Celliers de Calais, whose business was based around the British cross-channel trade. The stores were rebranded initially as Wine & Beer World, and then Majestic Wine Calais in 2013. Majestic closed its two remaining stores in Calais and Coquelles in 2021, stating that the stores were “no longer commercially viable” following changes to the duty-free alcohol personal allowance after the UK’s exit from the EU.
- March 2009 – Majestic acquired the privately owned companies Lay & Wheeler Ltd, WBI Ltd and Vinotheque Holdings Ltd as the fine wine specialist arm of Majestic Wine plc.
- February 2015 – Majestic announced the departure of chief executive Steve Lewis.
- April 2015 – Majestic acquired Naked Wines for up to £70 million, and appointed Naked's founder Rowan Gormley as group chief executive.
- December 2019 – Majestic Wine and Naked Wines split after private equity firm Fortress Investment Group struck a deal to buy the Majestic business, including its 200 stores and on-trade arm Majestic Commercial, for £95m. Fortress re-hired John Colley, who had previously served as managing director of Majestic's retail business, as Chief Executive. Following the split, Majestic Wine plc was renamed Naked Wines plc. Effectively, the previous shareholders of Majestic became shareholders of Naked Wines, as Majestic moved back into private ownership.
- August/September 2023 — Majestic opened new stores in Rugby, Warwickshire and Newark, Nottinghamshire, as part of its accelerated bricks-and-mortar expansion strategy.
- November 2023 — Majestic announced plans to open more than 50 new stores across the UK, with CEO John Colley describing physical retail as "sacrosanct" to the business.
- 2023/24 financial year — Majestic opened smaller-format "mini Majestic" stores in Harpenden, Crouch End and Marlow, as part of a strategy to target locations unable to support a full-size store.
- April 2024 — Majestic acquired Vagabond Wines out of administration for £6.5 million, taking on nine experiential wine bars across London and Birmingham and saving 171 jobs.
- July 2024 — Majestic unveiled a £1 million investment in its store estate, opening new stores in East Dulwich and Brentwood, Essex, alongside refurbished shops in Bearsden, Scotland and Stratford-upon-Avon. The company announced plans to identify 125 locations for potential new openings, targeting growth at an average of one new store per month.
- April 2025 — Majestic completed the acquisition of Enotria&Coe, one of the UK's leading premium wine and spirits distributors, founded as Enotria Wines by Remo Nardone in 1972. The deal established Majestic as the UK's largest premium wine specialist across retail, wholesale and hospitality.
- December 2025 — Majestic reported its best-ever Christmas trading, marking the tenth consecutive year of rising sales. Retail sales rose by 0.9% during the five weeks to 29 December 2025, while customer numbers increased by 10.9%, against a wider off-trade alcohol market that fell 4.1% over the same period.
- March 2026 — Owner Fortress Investment Group began preparations to sell Majestic Wine after seven years of ownership, following a period of significant growth that included opening more than 20 new stores and the acquisitions of Vagabond Wines and Enotria&Coe.

=== Under Fortress ownership ===
- January 2020 – New chief executive John Colley restructured his executive team, with managing director Josh Lincoln and chief customer officer Natalie Thng leaving the business. Former Tesco beers, wines, and spirits boss Robert Cooke was promoted from buying and merchandising director into the role of chief commercial officer, while Majestic veterans Keith Blessley and Nick Workman were named retail director and IT director respectively.
- May 2020 – Majestic Wine extended its relationship with Deliveroo in the United Kingdom, aiming to better reach customers staying at home because of the COVID-19 pandemic. Following the deal, 80 stores were able to fulfil Deliveroo orders from local customers.
- June 2020—Majestic confirmed a surge in sales during lockdown and said it served more than 150,000 new customers through its home delivery service while its stores were closed. The business also revealed plans to grow sales by 10% by 2025, roll out new ranges, improve staff training and relaunch its website as part of Colley's strategy to "get back to what we do best".
- November 2020—Majestic debuted its new brand, including a venture into fine wine, at its new store in Beckenham. The new shop is located inside a listed pavilion originally built in 1928.
- June 2021—Majestic launched its Shop Local online proposition, aiming to appeal to e-commerce customers by allowing them a live, real time view of stock available in their local store and place orders for same-day click-and-collect or home delivery.
- September 2021—Majestic launched its Wine Club subscription proposition, described as providing customers with exclusive new wines every quarter, video content from producers, and bespoke food pairing recipes.
- December 2021—Majestic closed its two remaining stores in Calais, blaming changes to the duty-free alcohol allowance following the UK's exit from the European Union. Prior to the referendum, UK residents were able to transport as much alcohol as they wanted across the English Channel, provided it was for personal consumption. After the UK left the EU, the personal allowance was cut to 42 litres of beer or 18 litres of non-sparkling wine. As a result, Majestic said the stores were “no longer commercially viable”.
- December 2022—Majestic published its results for the 2021/22 financial year, which included a 1.4% increase in revenues to £382.5 million and an 8% up tick in pre-tax profit to £17.3 million.
- April 2023—Majestic opened the doors to its first small format store in Harpenden. The 1,800 square foot store was half the size of an average Majestic shop and stocked a reduced selection of around 600 wines.
