= Virgin Vacations =

Tour operator

- Industry: Tour operator
- Founded: 1994
- Founder: Richard Branson
- Parent: Virgin Group
- Website: www.virgin-vacations.com

Virgin Vacations was the inclusive tour arm of Virgin Atlantic featuring land components (hotel packages, tours, etc.) in combination with Virgin Atlantic air to London. It was initially established in 1994. In May 2002, Virgin Vacations became a separate company after partnering with other airline carriers traveling to various worldwide destinations. Virgin Vacations offered travel packages to Europe, Asia, the South Pacific, Central America, South America, and South Africa. Travellers had the option of choosing complete vacation packages or the opportunity to create their own personalized vacation.

Virgin Vacations ceased operations March 31, 2019.

Virgin Vacations was an allied member of United States Tour Operators Association (USTOA).
