= Virgin Experience Days =

British company

- Type: Private
- Industry: Experience Days
- Founded: 1989 (as Acorne Sporting Starts Limited); renamed Virgin Experience Days Ltd in 2018 [cha]
- Headquarters: Bourne End, Buckinghamshire, United Kingdom [cha]
- Owner: Equistone Partners Europe (majority); Inflexion (minority)
- Number of employees: 50-100
- Website: www.virginexperiencedays.co.uk

Virgin Experience Days is a UK-based experience-gifting company that sells activity and experience vouchers to consumers and corporate clients in the United Kingdom and United States. Its US business trades as Virgin Gifts (formerly Virgin Experience Gifts), and its business-to-business division trades as Virgin Incentives.

== History ==
The registered company was incorporated in 1989 as Acorne Sporting Starts Limited, later renamed Acorne Sports Ltd. (1996), Acorne Limited (2004), Acorne PLC (2008), and Acorne Limited again (2017), before formally becoming Virgin Experience Days Ltd in 2018.

Virgin Experience Days operates in the experience-gifting sector, selling vouchers redeemable for activities such as spa days, driving experiences, and dining. In 2017, Inflexion Private Equity backed a management buyout of the company, and under Inflexion's ownership the business's revenues doubled over five years.

In March 2021, the company acquired Cloud 9 Living, a US experience-gifting business, marking its entry into the American market; Cloud 9 was subsequently rebranded as Virgin Experience Gifts.

In July 2022, Inflexion sold a majority stake in the company to Equistone Partners Europe, retaining a minority stake alongside the existing management team, who reinvested in the business. Financial terms of the deal were not disclosed.

In September 2025, the US business Virgin Experience Gifts was rebranded as Virgin Gifts, alongside a new UK and US brand platform called “Gift Anti-Ordinary.”

The rebrand followed a 12-month partnership with brand agency Further (formerly DesignStudio) and was intended to bring the UK and US businesses under a single global brand identity.The launch coincided with the appointment of Danni Rush as chief executive across the group's gifting businesses.

== Leadership ==
- Danni Rush — Chief Executive Officer, appointed July 2025. Rush joined the business in 2019 as Chief Customer Officer, later becoming Chief Operating Officer, before being promoted to CEO of Virgin Experience Days, Virgin Experience Gifts, and Virgin Incentives.
- Richard Segal — Chair of the Board, appointed November 2024.
- Christoph Homann — Chief Executive Officer, July 2023–2025. Previously chief executive of German digital gift card business Wishcard Technologies; succeeded Richard Hurd-Wood.
- Richard Hurd-Wood — Chief Executive Officer through the Inflexion and early Equistone ownership periods, stepping down in 2023. Led the company through the COVID-19 pandemic, its US market entry, and its sale to Equistone.

== Ownership ==
- 2017–2022: Majority owned by Inflexion Private Equity, following a management buyout.
- 2022–present: Majority owned by Equistone Partners Europe; Inflexion retains a minority stake.

== Products and services ==
The company sells vouchers for experiences spanning adventure and driving, flying, food and drink, spa and wellness, and touring, alongside a corporate rewards division, Virgin Incentives, with clients that have included Barclaycard and Samsung.

Trade press has described its range as spanning from flying vintage Spitfire aircraft to luxury afternoon teas. At the time of its 2021 acquisition of the US business Cloud 9 Living, the combined companies offered a catalogue of more than 4,000 experiences; by 2023, the US business's range had grown to more than 5,000 experiences.

In October 2024, the company partnered with the greetings-card marketplace Thortful, launching around 40 curated experience products—priced between £11 and £171—that Thortful customers could add to card orders ahead of Christmas.

For the financial year to 30 June 2024, the company reported turnover of £83.6 million, up from £81.9 million the previous year, while pre-tax profit fell from £8.9 million to £7.9 million amid weaker UK consumer confidence.

== Reception and market position ==
Trade and business press have described Virgin Experience Days as one of the leading providers in the UK's experience-gifting sector.
