= Olvi Cola =

Formerly Classic Cola

- Type: Soft Drink
- Manufacturer: Olvi
- Country of origin: Finland
- Flavour: Cola

Olvi Cola (formerly Classic Cola) is a cola soft drink manufactured by Olvi in Finland. There is also a sugar-free version.
