= Virgin Vodka =

Former brand of British alcoholic drink

Virgin Vodka was an alcoholic beverage produced by Virgin Drinks, a no longer extant subsidiary of the Virgin Group owned by Richard Branson. It was launched in 1994 and was withdrawn from the market some years later, as Virgin Drinks disbanded.

== History ==
Virgin Trading Company and William Grant & Sons announced a commercial agreement to market Virgin Vodka in the UK in 1994.
