= Virgin Cola =

Former carbonated soft drink

- Type: Carbonated cola soft drink
- Introduced: 1994; 32 years ago
- Discontinued: 2014; 12 years ago
- Variants: Diet Cola, Vanilla, Lime, Orange, Cloudy Lemon, Blue Lemon
- Website: www.virgindrinks.com

Virgin Cola was a carbonated cola soft drink, conceptualized by Richard Branson, and launched in 1994 by Virgin Group and Cott Beverage Corporation. The drink was created in an attempt to rival the leading Coca-Cola and Pepsi brands.

The drink launched in 1994 in the United Kingdom, and in 1998 in the United States. Other international markets included countries in Europe, the Asia Pacific, the Middle East and Africa, where Virgin Cola was either licensed to local bottling plants, or imported. Virgin Cola often engaged in unconventional marketing initiatives, such as its launch of 'The Pammy', a special edition bottle that resembled the curves of actress and model, Pamela Anderson.

In 2001, Virgin Cola left the U.S. market, and the UK bottling license then changed from Cott to Princes Group, and then eventually to Silver Spring Soft Drinks. In 2009, it was discontinued in the UK as its final major stocker, the supermarket Asda, ceased sales. In 2013, it was discontinued by its licensee in the Philippines, and then was discontinued in 2014 by its final licensee in Bangladesh and ceased existence.

Branson has since stated in retrospect that Virgin Cola was not much different to Coca-Cola or Pepsi, and learned from the experience to only go into markets where Virgin could be significantly better than the competition.

== History ==
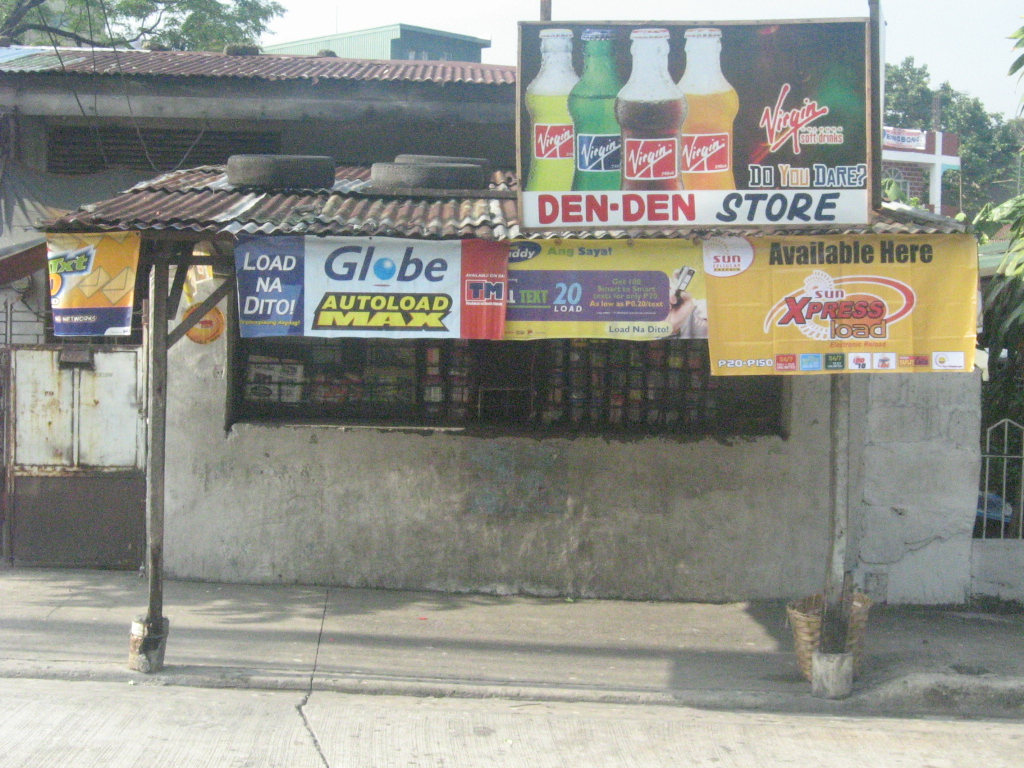
Virgin Cola advertised on a privilege sign (licensed locally by Asia Brewery) in front of a sari-sari store in Quezon City, Philippines.

Virgin Cola was set up during the early 1990s in conjunction with Cott, an American-Canadian company that specialises in bottling own-label drinks. Cott was looking for a major international brand that could have worldwide appeal. Virgin Group founder, Richard Branson was looking to widen the Virgin name and to rival the Coca-Cola and Pepsi brands.

Virgin Cola began to hit international shores within its first year. The UK first served the drink on Virgin Atlantic flights, on-board shops on Virgin Trains and also at Virgin Cinemas. The Gulliver's Kingdom chain of theme parks in the UK also sold post-mix Virgin Cola. This led Virgin Cola to agree a distribution deal with British supermarket retailer Tesco in 1994.

A promotional blimp can be seen saving a woman's life on the show Baywatch, in the episode "The Runaways", first aired in the U.S. on May 20, 1995. The episode features Richard Branson heavily.

From 1996, the 500ml bottles were marketed as "The Pammy", as their curves were designed to resemble Pamela Anderson who was at the height of her popularity in the UK at the time. It went on to be launched in Europe, starting with France and Belgium.

In February 1998, Virgin Cola was launched in South Africa.

=== US release and international expansion ===
In 1998, Branson attended the USA launch of Virgin Cola driving a T-54/55 tank into New York City's Times Square. It subsequently agreed distribution channels with US retailers such as Target. A can of Virgin Cola appears in Ally McBeal in the title character's refrigerator in the episode "Love Unlimited", first aired on 18 January 1999. In season 4 episode 10 of Buffy the Vampire Slayer ("The Hush"), Willow is seen drinking a can of Virgin Cola in a scene with Buffy. A bottle of Virgin Cola can be seen on the coffee table in Monica and Rachel's apartment in the Friends episode "The One with Joey's Bag" that first aired in the U.S. on 4 February 1999. Branson had previously appeared in an episode and was said to be a fan of the show.

Virgin Drinks USA, the company dealing in Virgin Cola's US market, closed in April 2001, having managed to establish just a 0.5% share of the market by volume. The license for Virgin Cola in the UK then changed from Cott to Princes Soft Drinks.

In 2002, a vanilla cola called Virgin Vanilla was launched in the UK by Princes Soft Drinks, ahead of the launch of a similar product from rival Coca-Cola.

Also in 2002, Virgin Cola entered Tunisia, however would exit the market in 2006; this was via a partnership with Délice Danone, which was 50% owned by Hamdi Meddeb.

In March 2004, Princes Soft Drinks announced that Virgin Cola UK would undergo a relaunch to focus on the teenage market, while at the same time discontinuing the Vanilla and Caffeine Free varieties.

As of 2006, Virgin Cola was bottled in United Kingdom, Bangladesh, Philippines and Tunisia, as well as being available in Afghanistan, China, Europe (France, French West Indies, Italy, Kosovo, Malta and Switzerland), Iraq, Japan, and Nigeria.

By 2007, the Virgin Cola business had reached a limited capacity in the UK, with its distribution license being taken over from Princes Group by Silver Spring in August 2007. In July 2008, the brand announced that it would be relaunched with a product placement deal secured with Channel 4 to promote the drink on its music programme T-Mobile Transmission.

=== Decline ===
"We had a great brand. But Coke had a great brand. The taste of the Cola was maybe marginally better, but it was neither here nor there. So since then what I learned from that was only to go into businesses where we were palpably better than all the competition."

—Branson's retrospective on Virgin Cola.

In August 2009, Asda, the last major UK supplier of Virgin Cola, removed it from their shelves due to poor sales. The UK bottler, Silver Spring, would eventually collapse into administration. No other bottler would acquire the Virgin Cola license in the United Kingdom.

In 2013-2014, Asia Brewery in the Philippines discontinued Virgin Cola.

In 2014, Global Beverage Company Limited, the final international licensee for Virgin Cola, based in Bangladesh, stopped producing the beverage, leading to its total demise. Branson claimed he decided to pull the plug after seeing that Bangladesh was the only remaining success.

== Legacy ==
According to a retrospective by Branson, a campaign was run by The Coca-Cola Company against Virgin Cola. Originally, Coca-Cola did not treat Virgin as a serious competitor. However, when Virgin started outselling Coke in the United Kingdom and entered the American market, Coke realised it needed to do something. At the suggestion of a British Coca-Cola executive, Coke assembled teams for an influencing campaign. Its intent was to make deals with retailers that sold Coke and Virgin Cola to get Virgin Cola removed from the shelves. Branson admitted Virgin did not know this was going on and it eventually led to a drop in sales. In the United Kingdom, Virgin Cola had become discontinued in Tesco, the UK's biggest supermarket. Later the Coke executive would work for Lloyds TSB and would become the manager of Virgin Group's bank accounts; when he found out from her at a dinner, Branson said "I wasn't sure whether to strangle her or not" but forgave her for it.

== Variants ==
In addition to Cola, the Virgin brand was also used for other beverages.

Name	Year launched	Notes	Ref.
Diet Virgin Cola	1994	A low-calorie variant of the standard Virgin Cola that is sweetened with Aspartame instead of Sugar or Corn Syrup. Known as Virgin Cola Light outside the UK and US.	
Virgin Energy	1995	An Energy Drink variant, sold in the UK and Italy (as Virgin Hi-Energy).	
Virgin Lips Orange	1996	An Orange flavoured variant sold in the UK.	
Virgin Lips Lemon-Lime	1996	A Lemon-Lime flavoured variant sold in the UK. It was also sold in Italy as Virgin Blue.	
Virgin Ginger Beer	1996	A Ginger Beer drink sold in the UK.	
Virgin Green	1999	A Bitter orange variant sold in Italy.	
Virgin Pulp	1999	A Citrus drink containing orange pulp, sold in France as a rival to Orangina.	
Virgin Ruby	1990s	A Strawberry variant sold in Singapore.	
Virgin Neon Green	1990s	A Banana and Pineapple variant sold in Singapore.	
Virgin Purple	1990s	A Grape/Berry variant sold in Singapore and other Asian territories.	
Virgin Pink	1990s	A Pomelo variant sold in Singapore.	
Virgin Cool Blue	1990s	A Tutti frutti variant sold in Singapore.	
Virgin DT (Daytime); Virgin NT (Nighttime)	2000	Two Energy Drink variants containing caffeine, taurine, vitamins, and ginseng which were sold in the UK, marketed as a rival to Red Bull. While both the same beverage, the NT variant is alcoholic and contains 1 1/2 shots of Vodka.	
Virgin Mini-V	2000	A Caffeine-free variant of the standard Virgin Cola, aimed towards the child market. While it contained less sugar than the standard variety, it did not contain any artificial sweeteners. It was discontinued in 2004 when the brand relaunched to focus on the teenage market.	
Virgin Vanilla	2002	A Vanilla cola variant sold in the United Kingdom as the first Vanilla Cola to hit the country, predating Vanilla Coke. It was discontinued in 2004 when the brand relaunched to focus on the teenage market.	
Virgin Sours	2003	A soft drink range with a "sour" taste sold in the UK by Princes Soft Drinks. It was available in three flavours: Heek Chillin' Cherry, Raspin' Blue Raspberry and Eye Squeezin' Apple, and was targeted towards a child/teen audience. The product was discontinued at the end of 2004 following low sales.	

== See also ==
- List of defunct consumer brands
