= BT Enterprise =

Division of BT Group

BT Business
- Company type: Division
- Industry: Telecommunications
- Predecessor: BT Business and Public Sector; BT Wholesale and Ventures
- Fate: Merged with BT Global Services
- Successor: BT Business
- Headquarters: One Braham Street, London, United Kingdom
- Area served: United Kingdom; Republic of Ireland
- Key people: Rob Shuter (CEO)
- Products: Fixedline telephony; Mobile telephony; Broadband internet; IT services; Payphones; Directory solutions; Home security; Supply chain management
- Revenue: ▼£5.34 billion (2021)
- Number of employees: 11,300 (2021)
- Parent: BT Group
- Website: business.bt.com

BT Business is a division of British telecommunications company BT Group that provides products and services to organisations in the small-to-medium-sized business, corporate and public sectors, and wholesale services through BT Wholesale. These offerings include fixed and IP voice, unified communications, mobile telephony, cyber security, cloud computing and managed services.

It was formed through the combination of BT's UK-based Enterprise division with its Global business in January 2023. Bas Burger, CEO of BT Global at the time, was appointed CEO of the new combined business.

Enterprise's Wholesale unit (marketed as BT Wholesale) provides communication providers and other organisations with fixed or mobile phone services, with more than 1,400 customers, including Sky, Talk Talk, Virgin Media O2 and Three. BT Business also offers media and broadcasting services in the UK and globally, working with major broadcasters including BBC, Channel 4, ITV, Sky, and Premier League Productions.

== History ==
The formation of BT Enterprise came a year after BT's decision to consolidate its consumer services into one operational division, with the group's brands, BT, EE and Plusnet being brought under one umbrella and management structure.

Announced in April 2018 by Gavin Patterson, then CEO of BT, Enterprise began reporting as a combined unit of Business and Public Sector, and Wholesale and Ventures from October 2018, officially marking the operational start of the division.

In August 2019, the BT Group agreed to sell its BT Fleet Solutions (otherwise simply known as BT Fleet) business, a business operating under Enterprise, to private equity group Aurelius Equity for an undisclosed sum. Founded in 2002, Fleet Solutions was responsible for the management of BT's 35,000 vehicles (29,000 of which were Openreach vehicles) as well as providing management to a further 50,000 vehicles for other organisations. Two months later, Fleet Solutions' new owner, Aurellius, dropped BT from its name as it rebranded to Rivus Fleet Solutions.

The reasoning behind the sale of BT Fleet aligned with the reasoning behind the formation of Enterprise a year earlier, with BT Group bidding to cut its overheads by around £1.5 billion. The group, which was forced to spin off its networking business Openreach into an independent but wholly owned subsidiary, faced pressure to fund Openreach's rollout of fibre-to-the-property in the UK with competitors such as CityFibre ramping up their efforts to get areas connected to fibre.

In March 2020, a further business operating under Enterprise was sold by BT. Tikit, a global legal, accounting and professional services software business, was sold by the group to Advanced for £84 million. BT had acquired Tikit itself in 2012 for a fee of £64 million. Enterprise CEO Gerry McQuade said: “With BT’s renewed focus on investing in our core business, the time is right for a new owner to maximise Tikit’s full potential."

In September 2020, Enterprise announced a five-year strategic partnership with lifeboat charity RNLI to provide the charity with modern communication services, as well as developing more ways technology can help the RNLI save more lives at sea.

== 999 call handling ==
Enterprise is responsible for BT's 999 call handling operation, which handles more than 90,000 calls per day from seven of its call centres. It answers 999 calls from Northern Ireland, Scotland, Wales and England, passing the calls to the relevant emergency service. It's a service that BT has provided for more than 80 years, when it operated under the General Post Office umbrella.

== Future ==
On 16 December 2022, BT announced that Enterprise would be merged with Global to form a new division, BT Business, in an effort to save £100 million each year by the end of the 2025 financial year. The new division will be led by Bas Burger.

== See also ==
- BT Consumer
- BT Global
