= BT Business and Public Sector =

Retail division of BT Group

BT Business
- Company type: Division
- Industry: Telecommunications
- Predecessor: BT Retail; BT Business
- Successor: BT Enterprise
- Headquarters: One Braham, London, United Kingdom
- Area served: United Kingdom; Republic of Ireland
- Products: Fixedline telephony Mobile telephony Broadband internet IT services
- Parent: BT Group
- Website: www.bt.com/business

BT Business and Public Sector was a division of United Kingdom telecommunications company BT Group that provided fixed-line, mobile, broadband and IT services to businesses (predominantly small and medium-sized enterprises) and the public sector in the UK and Ireland. It bought many of its services from BT's other divisions: EE, BT Global Services, BT Wholesale and Openreach. It also sold other vendors' products and services such as the Avaya IP Office business telephone system.

In April 2018, Gavin Patterson, then BT Group's CEO, announced Wholesale and Ventures was to be combined with the group's Business and Public Sector division into a newly-formed division, BT Enterprise. It came after BT's decision to undertake a streamlining of its operations, in a bid to strengthen its offerings as a business.

Prior to its merger with Wholesale and Ventures, Business and Public Sector was formerly known as BT Business that was established alongside BT Consumer following a two-way split from former division, BT Retail in 2013 to allow BT to "better serve its customers and focus even more on delivering its strategic priorities". It took on the business operations of BT Retail that involved the merging of BT Business, BT Enterprises and BT Ireland while BT Wi-fi (part of BT Enterprises) and the consumer part of BT Ireland transferred to BT Consumer. It took on its current name following BT's new organisational structure that took effect in April 2016 after its acquisition of EE, and comprises the existing BT Business division along with EE's business division and those parts of BT Global Services that are UK focused.

== Products ==
BT Business provides the following products as of 28 January 2016:

=== Voice ===
- Phone lines and featurelines
- Voice over IP (VoIP) services
- On-premises phone systems
- ISDN - provides high-performance voice and data services
- Conferencing - audio, web and video conferencing
- Business numbers
- Payphone services
- BT One Phone
- Trading turret systems
  - Key competitors are IPC Systems and Cloud9

=== Mobile ===
- Mobile phone contracts
- SIM-only contracts
- Tablet contracts
- BT One Phone

=== Broadband ===
- BT Broadband - provides standard broadband
- BT Infinity - provides fibre-optic broadband
- Mobile broadband - provides data allowance, hardware and tablet options
- BTnet Leased Lines - provides leased lines to access the internet

=== IT services ===
==== Networking ====
- Ethernet VPN
- Ethernet Point-to-Point (P2P) - extends LAN across local sites without compromising on performance or security
- IP Connect - connects multiple sites and/or simplifies communications to a single private IP VPN
- Managed WAN - connects your sites to each other on a virtual private network

==== Computing & Apps ====
- Microsoft Office 365 - a cloud-based version of Microsoft Office
- Enhanced IT Support - a 24/7 remote IT support service
- Web hosting - create and manage websites to be accessible via the World Wide Web
- Domain registration - provides the facility to purchase and manage domain names
- BT Buynet/SafePay - a payment reconciliation with real-time authorisation, daily settlement, and easy-to-understand reporting
- BT eShop - provides various tools for the creation and management of your own online shop

==== Bring Your Own Device ====
Bring Your Own Device (BYOD) allows employees to use their own devices.

==== BT PC Security ====
BT PC Security is a complete internet security and antivirus protection suite, in association with McAfee.

==== Cloud & Data Centre Solutions ====
Cloud & Data Centre Solutions provides a range of server technology, software and platforms.

== See also ==
- BT Consumer
