= BT Mobile =

British mobile virtual network operator

- Type: MVNO
- Industry: Telecommunications
- Founded: March 2015
- Headquarters: BT Centre; London, EC1; United Kingdom
- Area served: United Kingdom
- Services: Mobile telephony
- Owner: BT Group
- Website: www.bt.com/products/mobile

BT Mobile is a mobile virtual network operator (MVNO) provided by BT Consumer; a division of BT Group in the United Kingdom that was launched in March 2015. It used the EE network via an MVNO agreement signed in March 2014 as well as using the spectrum BT won in the 2013 4G auction. EE is now owned by BT following a successful acquisition that was officially completed on 29 January 2016. BT Mobile operated alongside BT Business Mobile which is provided by the BT Business and Public Sector division. BT Mobile launched as a SIM-only service and had more than 400,000 customers as of 5 May 2016. BT Mobile stopped accepting new customers in October 2023, as part of plans by the BT Group to make EE the main brand of the consumer business.

BT Mobile was re-launched on 20 May 2026 as part of a wider brand refresh.

== Products ==
=== SIM-only plans ===
BT Mobile was a fully fledged mobile service with handsets and sim-only offers four 12-month contract plans as of 7 November 2020:

1. BT Mobile 500MB Plan – 500MB of data, 500 minutes and unlimited texts
2. BT Mobile 10GB Plan – 10GB of data, 1000 minutes and unlimited texts
3. BT Mobile 16GB Plan – 16GB of data, unlimited minutes and texts
4. BT Mobile 20GB Plan – 20GB of data, unlimited minutes and texts
5. BT Mobile 30GB Plan – 30GB of data, unlimited minutes and texts
6. BT Mobile 100GB – 100GB of data, unlimited minutes and texts

Anyone living in a BT Broadband home was eligible for a £5 monthly discount on all BT Mobile plans - each account holder could have up to five discounted plans but with no limit to the number of people in a house that could take up the offer.

== Features ==
=== TNT Sports ===
Subscribers to BT Mobile could watch TNT Sports through the dedicated mobile streaming app. However, watching BT Sport via television still required a paid subscription.

=== BT Wi-Fi ===
Subscribers to BT Mobile had unlimited access to BT Wi-Fi, regardless of the data allowance in their contracts. Connection to BT Wi-Fi could be made through a web browser or the dedicated BT Wi-Fi application.

=== BT Mobile App ===
The BT Mobile app allows subscribers to keep on top of their contract allowance, allowing them to see their minutes, texts and remaining data allowance. The app also shows out-of-contract spending, details of the subscribers' contract and information on data roaming.

== Services ==
=== Network ===
BT Mobile offered 4G as standard to all customers at no extra cost and in order to benefit from 4G speeds, a 4G-ready phone is required. However, customers in areas with no 4G coverage or without a 4G-ready phone could previously connect via the 3G and 2G networks.

In 2024, BT Group completed the shutdown of its 3G mobile network across the UK via EE, as part of a wider transition toward 4G and 5G technologies.

==== Coverage ====
As BT Mobile used the EE network, its 4G network reached more than 95% of the UK population while its 3G network reached 98% and 2G network reaches 99%, as of 2016.

==== Extra Speed 4G ====
On 3 February 2016, BT announced a new add-on service called Extra Speed 4G for BT Mobile customers, allowing them to access even faster upload and download speeds than standard 4G, provided they are in an Extra Speed 4G area. The speeds can reach a maximum of up to 60 Mbit/s and the service costs £4 a month and is a 30-day rolling contract, which means customers won't be tied in for 12 months. The speed will vary on a day-to-day basis and depends on various things such as coverage, distance from the mast, the number of people using the network and the type of 4G phone you have, as well as whether you're indoors or in a densely populated area.

==== Wi-Fi calling ====
BT introduced Wi-Fi Calling on 29 March 2018, which allows customers to use Wi-Fi to call and text in areas with poor or no signal, and will come out of their monthly minutes and texts allowance or at the normal network rate, with no extra charge. It works on any Apple handset from iPhone 5S onwards and certain Android handsets bought from BT Mobile. For existing customers, BT's 'My BT' and BT Mobile app offer the ability to check phone compatibility. The phone's software must be updated to take benefit of the service, minimum iOS 11.3 or later for Apple handsets.

==== 4G calling ====
BT introduced 4G calling (VoLTE) on 29 March 2018, which allows customers to make calls over 4G and can continue to use 4G data as they talk. It works on any Apple handset from iPhone 6 onwards and certain Android handsets bought from BT Mobile. For existing customers, BT's 'My BT' and BT Mobile app offer the ability to check phone compatibility. The phone's software must be updated to take benefit of the service, with a minimum of iOS 11.3 or later for Apple handsets.

=== Voicemail ===
BT Mobile automatically diverted all unanswered calls to voicemail. Customers received a text from BT when a voicemail is left. It used the same voicemail code (1571) as BT's fixed lines.

=== Parental controls ===
BT Mobile offered free parental controls to limit what a user can access via the internet such as blocking inappropriate content.

=== Brand transition to EE ===
In April 2022, BT Group announced plans to turn the EE brand which BT acquired in January 2016, into their main “flagship brand” for their consumer Business. As part of this plan, BT mobile stopped accepting new customers in October 2023, with BT mobile products gradually being withdrawn over this period. Existing customers must transfer to EE to start a new contract, but active customers outside of contract remain on the BT mobile brand at time of writing. The brand will remain operational for business customers.

In May 2026, BT announced BT mobile was returning for retail customers with the transition to EE shelved.
