= Plusnet =

British Internet service provider

Plusnet plc
- Type: Subsidiary
- Industry: Internet service provider, Telecommunications, IPTV
- Founded: 1 February 1997; 29 years ago (as Plusnet Technologies Ltd)
- Headquarters: Sheffield, England
- Key people: Claire Gillies (CEO, BT Consumer)
- Products: Internet services; Landline telephone services
- Parent: BT Consumer (BT Group)
- Website: plus.net

Plusnet plc is a British Internet service provider (ISP) providing broadband and landline services. The company was founded in 1997 in Sheffield, and became a public limited company (plc) in July 2004 when it was floated on the Alternative Investment Market. On 30 January 2007, Plusnet was acquired by BT Group, but it continued to operate as a separate business. By December 2013, it had over 750,000 customers across the UK.

In 2018, Plusnet was brought into BT Group's BT Consumer division, the CEO of which is Claire Gillies.

Plusnet Mobile operated as a mobile virtual network operator using the network of EE until it was closed in 2024.

== History ==
=== Origins ===
Company names:

- FORCE9 INTERNET LIMITED: 15 Nov 1996 – 12 Dec 1997
- PLUSNET TECHNOLOGIES LIMITED: 12 Dec 1997 – 07 Jul 2004
- PLUSNET PLC: 07 Jul 2004 – 30 Jan 2007

Plusnet's origins go back to 1 February 1997, when Choice Peripherals, a PC computer-peripherals company launched Force9 Internet. Heavily involved in early Plusnet was founder of Choice Peripherals, Paul Cusack (chairman), who later went on to create the hardware retailer Ebuyer, and Lee Strafford (managing director), who later went on to lead Plusnet through most of its development up to the sale to BT in January 2007.

Screenshot of the original Force9 webpage, from 1998

The first Force9 Internet products followed the dial-up internet model popularised by Demon Internet (monthly subscription, plus the cost of local phone calls), but offered at a lower cost to subscribers (£6 a month + VAT), and including more value-added features. By October 1997, Force9 had achieved the milestone of 5,000 subscribers, assisted by a marketing partnership with Yorkshire Cable (later to become part of Telewest), in which Yorkshire Cable customers were offered a reduced subscription on a Force9 account. In addition, software which used Force9 Internet as the default ISP was supplied with every modem ordered through Choice Peripherals.

As the business grew, Force9 was split out as a separate operation from Choice Peripherals, with new premises and an umbrella company under which it would operate. This company, Plusnet Technologies Ltd, opened its doors at Internet House, Victoria Quays, Sheffield, in November 1997.

Although the company was named Plusnet, the brand was first used for products by the business sales team at Force9, for leased line and server colocation services to small and medium enterprises (SMEs).

In April 1998, Insight Enterprises, an American PC-peripherals company, made a move into the UK market by acquiring Choice Peripherals. However, Insight were principally interested in the online commerce side of the operation, and not in the ISP, Force9. Because of this, Insight largely left the ISP side of the business operating as it had been, with Lee Strafford remaining in charge of the operation. This coincided with the April 1999 launch of Force9's version of 'unmetered' dial up, which gave 0800 free call rate internet access during weekend hours. The website was re-branded as F9 in order to promote it.

In June 2000, the Force9 brand was changed to Plusnet. This coincided with the introduction of the Surftime dial-up internet products, the first real 24/7 unmetered dial-up service in the UK.

Plusnet continued to see month on month growth in the dial-up market, and this growth was further augmented with the launch of a 512 kbit/s ADSL broadband internet service in August 2000. Plusnet launched their first broadband products on the same day that BT made them available to the UK market.

Plusnet continued to develop their product set over the next few years as new broadband speeds and technologies became available. The initial broadband product performed at a speed of 512 kbit/s, and required a BT engineer to visit the customer premises to install the service. As time went on, the maximum speeds increased. In January 2002, Plusnet launched a 'self Install' broadband product that the end user was able to set up themselves without the need for a visit to the premises by a BT engineer.

In January 2004, the Force9 brand was still used by PlusNet Technologies Ltd. Plusnet Technologies Ltd. floated on the Alternative Investment Market of the London Stock Exchange as Plusnet PLC.

In November 2004, Plusnet won best consumer ISP at the Future Publishing internet awards.

In November 2005, Plusnet acquired Parbin Ltd and its consumer ISP MetroNet, which at that time provided a range of 'pay as you go' broadband packages. As part of the Parbin acquisition, Plusnet assumed ownership of several other brands: Pay as You Host, INUK and Port995.

=== Acquisition by BT ===
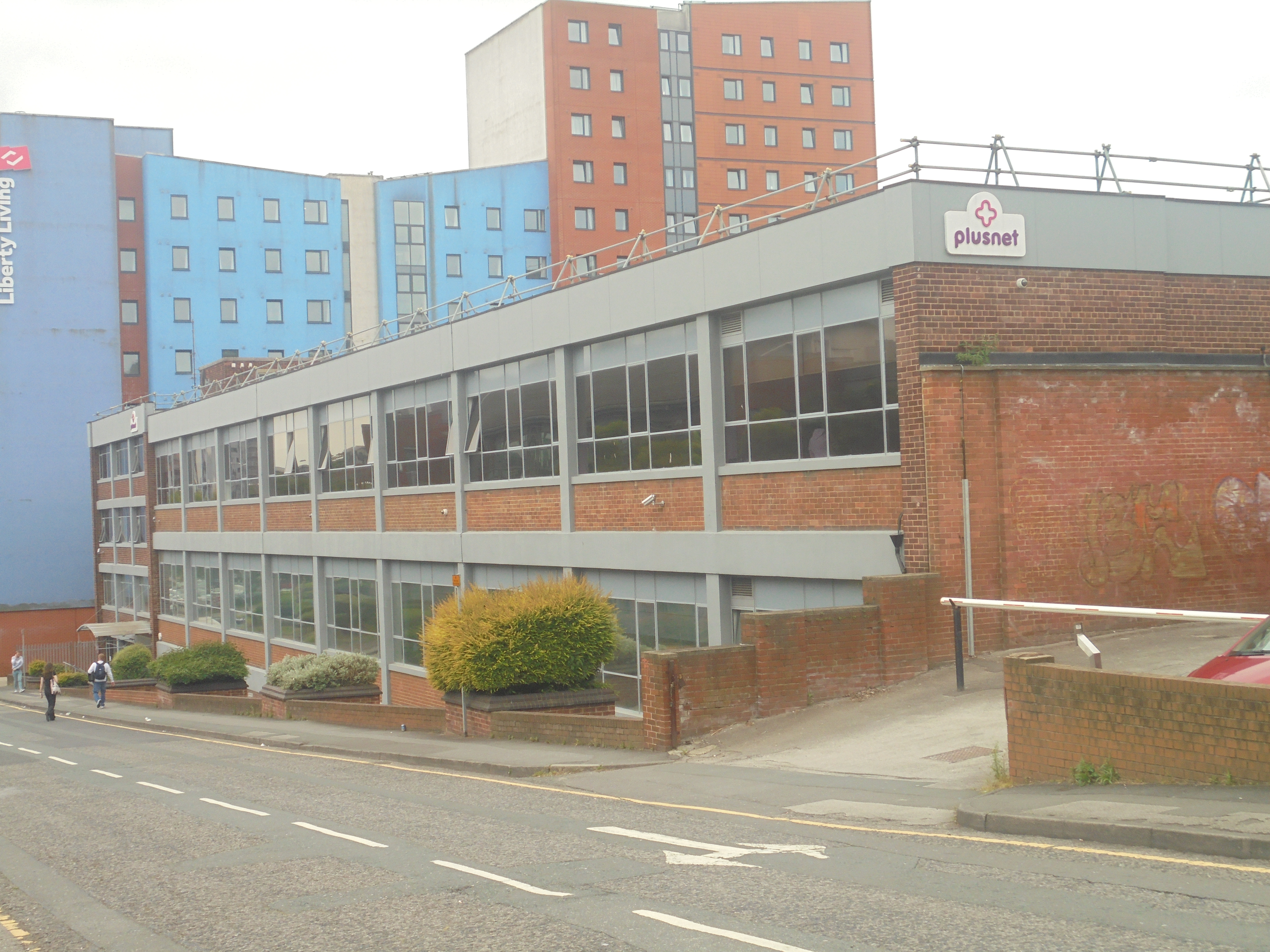
Plusnet offices in Burley, Leeds

On 16 November 2006, it was announced that BT were making an offer for all shares in Plusnet. The purchase, worth approximately £67 million, was declared unconditional on 24 January 2007 after Office of Fair Trading approval was granted.

On 5 March 2007, shortly after the BT acquisition, the Plusnet chief executive, Lee Strafford, and the finance director, Neil Comer, were dismissed by BT. Strafford was replaced as CEO by a former BT employee, Neil Laycock, who had been with Plusnet in various senior roles for the preceding three years.

BT bought the Brightview Group in July 2007, and Brightview's subsidiary Madasafish became a trading name of Plusnet.

In November 2019, it was announced that some 1,600 employees at Sheffield and Leeds would be transferred to BT in February 2020. At the same time, Andy Baker said he would step down as CEO of Plusnet, after six years in the role.

== Services ==
=== ISP services ===
==== Hardware ====
Plusnet provides asymmetric digital subscriber line (ADSL/VDSL) broadband and full fibre broadband products to residential and business customers. They are supplied with the Hub Two, a re-branded version of the BT Smart Hub 2 with a modified user interface.

Plusnet previously provided two variants of router: the Plusnet Hub Zero (Sagemcom 2704n) router with its ADSL packages, and the Plusnet Hub One (a rebadged BT Hub 5) with its fibre packages.

==== Network capacity ====
Plusnet was one of the first ISPs in the UK to use network quality of service (QoS) techniques, which it introduced in November 2004, in order to control the finite data bandwidth available to them at peak times. This move was a reaction to the cost of bandwidth, £210 per Mbit/s per month in November 2006 for ISPs using the BT Wholesale network. Critics have suggested that the decision to employ QoS on the network was driven by Plusnet's focus on delivering to tight profit targets dictated by investors during the time when they were a public limited company (plc). Plusnet replaced its QoS technique with a Sustainable Usage Policy (SUP) in 2005.

In 2007, around the time of acquisition by BT, an additional 930 Mbit/s of data bandwidth was made available by adding six BT IPStream segments to the network. This additional capacity has brought the Plusnet total broadband network capacity to 22 155 Mbit/s BT Central segments. This is delivered over five full 622 Mbit/s BT Centrals (four 155 Mbit/s in each BT Central) and two BT Centrals with one segment of 155 Mbit/s active in each. This services a total of just over 200,000 customers at October 2007.

This total data bandwidth figure is only slightly higher than Plusnet's capacity in January 2005, before Plusnet used Network QoS, when they had a total of seventeen segments (ten 155 Mbit/s Centrals and seven segments delivered over two 622 Mbit/s pipes) and 100,000 customers. At that time, there was an imbalance on their network as a result of issues that are caused from using a mixture of pipes. In February 2005, Plusnet reduced to a total of sixteen segments delivered over five 622 Mbit/s pipes (622s are slightly more efficient than 155 Meg segments, so this allowed for a similar amount of throughput).

In August 2005, Plusnet was forced through contractual obligation to upgrade to seventeen segments, and in January 2006, moved to eighteen segments. Plusnet's acquisition of Parbin Ltd in November 2005; with 16,000 customers and three 155 Mbit/s segments gave Plusnet a total of twenty-one segments. However, Plusnet absorbed all of these new customers and decommissioned the three segments, bringing them back to eighteen segments. This was further reduced by two segments, bringing it to sixteen in total – at around the same time as nearly 20,000 customers were moved to the Tiscali local-loop unbundling (LLU) network in July 2006.

There is controversy that the last two segments should not have been removed. Particularly as at that time, Plusnet increased allowances on all the residential packages. When this contradiction was exposed in December 2006, Plusnet defended their actions, but the explanation given was not positively received by the community at the time.

Plusnet reported that the slowdown in the increase of capacity from January 2005 was due to two major reasons. The introduction of their lower cost, lower capacity allowance, broadband product; which many existing customers moved to, and the introduction of Network QoS and the general network management policy to combat the spiralling usage of a small portion (around 1%) of the customer base. However, it was not fully explained how Plusnet expected to deliver the performance of their broadband packages to 180,000 customers on the same capacity as they had when they only had 100,000 customers.

==== Usage restrictions ====
Plusnet has, on a number of occasions, redefined their product usage guidelines in order to reflect changes in overall customer usage or in the costs they incur from their suppliers. This has resulted in customers being asked to restrict their usage, upgrade to a different product, or leave the company entirely. This practice has become common within the ISP market in the UK and is generally accepted, however Plusnet has sometimes made these changes without warning or notice to their customers. Plusnet has argued that the changes made didn't require any notice to be given because they don't consider them to form part of the legal contract with the consumer.

Plusnet is one of the few UK ISPs to publish a full breakdown of its wholesale costs, as part of the Plusnet Broadband Blueprint document.

==== Deep packet inspection and bandwidth management ====
Plusnet used to make heavy use of traffic prioritisation (this ended in 2017) to maintain a stable service. Plusnet acknowledges on their website how network QoS impacts individual protocols and as a result what experience they expect the end-user to receive. This broadband experience is subject to periodic changes without notice in order to preserve the quality of network performance for the protocols that demand extremely low latency. Customers are notified of changes by checking Plusnet's website, freephone telephone number or RSS feed.

The use of Arbor Networks E30 Ellacoya platform to perform traffic fingerprinting using deep packet inspection and Juniper Networks ERX switches to perform protocol shaping has seen a situation where all protocols, including encrypted P2P traffic are identified and managed on their network.

Plusnet's position is that this prioritisation is in place to ensure time-critical applications like VoIP, gaming, browsing and video streaming (from sites like YouTube) are prioritised above applications that would otherwise swamp their available network capacity to the detriment of other customers' broadband experience. File sharing applications and binary Usenet are the most heavily managed protocols on Plusnet's network, and are collectively treated as low priority on most of their consumer products.

Plusnet announced that as of 29 July 2017, traffic prioritisation was to be removed from its residential customers.

==== Identification of traffic ====
Deliberate traffic shaping is deployed on the Plusnet network in order to ensure QoS. Mistakes when this system was first implemented resulted in misclassification of some protocols, which made certain applications unusable at peak times. This was improved when the classification of unidentified traffic was raised in priority. Non-standard applications still remain susceptible to misclassification (e.g. running SSH on a non standard port other than 4500 or 10000 which are set aside by Plusnet for this purpose).

Continual improvements in protocol identification along with a significant increase in available bandwidth mean that the implementation is generally considered to be working successfully.

==== IPv6 support ====
As of April 2020, Plusnet did not in general provide IPv6 connectivity to its customers, but were trialling IPv6 with selected customers. In December 2013, Plusnet started its "Next Phase" IPv6 trial. Participating in this trial required the participants to provide and reconfigure their own IPv6-compatible routers. The trial was active from December 2013, but is closed for new applicants.

Plusnet had earlier run a small trial with real end-users for World IPv6 Day in June 2011, with both their website and broadband customers on IPv6 on that day. The first IPv6 broadband user "technical trial" ran until July 2012.

=== Virtual ISPs ===
Plusnet has operated a number of "Virtual ISP" brands, both for its own company and for others. These alternative brands use the Plusnet network and software infrastructure. These brands include:

- BT One Enterprise Connect and BT One Enterprise broadband – BT Global Services utilise their own Workplace platform within their Teleworker product, to deliver remote broadband access for its major corporate customers
- Plusnet supports the legacy Vodafone@Home service, after around 8,000 Vodafone customers were migrated to the Plusnet brand on 7 February 2012.

== Former services ==
=== ISP brands ===
- Metronet – A brand acquired as part of the acquisition of Parbin Ltd in 2005.
- Madasafish, part of the Brightview Group, itself owned by BT, which includes FreeNetName, ic24, globalnet and others. Madasafish is no longer available to new customers as all of the customers were migrated to plus.net when it shutdown.
- Force9 – The original ISP brand used residentially by Plusnet – now merged into Plusnet as of September 2007
- www.plus.net.uk – Plusnet brand catering for business customers – later merged into Plusnet
- Free-Online (FoL) – merged into Plusnet in September 2007
- Charity Days – a brand created for Donate As You Surf Ltd, which donated money to charity. This business was purchased outright by Plusnet in 2006. Now discontinued.
- Your Ideal – a brand created for Lloyds TSB
- Dabs Online – vISP created for computer retailer, dabs.com, also now owned by BT.
- John Lewis broadband – a brand of retailer John Lewis, operated by Plusnet as a "white-label" product. The service closed to new customers in October 2022 and then to existing customers when they reached the end of their contract.

=== Virtual mobile network ===
In November 2016, Plusnet acquired mobile virtual network operator LIFE Mobile as part of BT's acquisition of EE. LIFE Mobile was subsequently re-branded as Plusnet Mobile. The network was closed to new customers in March 2023, with the firm offering exclusive discounts to encourage people to move over to EE. In June 2024, Plusnet shut down the service.

=== YouView TV from Plusnet ===
In 2015, Plusnet started to offer Plusnet TV via the YouView platform which used the Freeview digital television free-to-air service, supplemented by IPTV provision of premium bundles. Plusnet offered two types of YouView boxes, the YouView + box and a standard YouView box. The YouView + box had recording facilities whereas the standard box did not. Plusnet TV closed on 1 November 2021.

== Marketing ==
In October 2010, Plusnet launched an advertising campaign designed to increase brand awareness nationally which emphasised the company's Yorkshire roots, using the strapline "Good Honest Broadband from Yorkshire". The strapline was replaced in April 2012 by "We'll do you proud", but the new campaign remained heavily influenced by Northern stereotypes. From 2013, the company became sponsors of the Yorkshire Marathon, run in York. The spokesman in the adverts was Craig Murray.

== Controversies ==
In February 2001, the company asked 1,100 dial-up customers to leave the service after they had stayed connected to an "unmetered" (but contended) dial-up service for long periods of time.

On 9 July 2006, Plusnet lost 700 GB of customer email data due to human error. During a routine maintenance upgrade to the email system, an engineer mistakenly reformatted a live disk pack instead of the intended backup disk pack. Plusnet provided updates on their investigation but did not reveal the size or cause of the problem until 10 July 2006 at 15:39. Plusnet explained that the engineer responsible had accessed both the live and backup disk packs from a single workstation. The engineer believed his reconfiguration was to the backup storage when it was actually connected to the live email disk pack. In the following days, Plusnet did recover some email data and explained that other data may have been lost to corruption during the recovery. The official Plusnet UserGroup launched an "Email Stability & Resiliency Campaign" to attempt to ensure Plusnet made suitable investments and put in place measures to prevent future issues.

In March 2017, it was fined £880,000 by Ofcom for continuing to bill customers for cancelled services.
