= Starch (video game) =

1990 video game

- Developer: Mark Dixon
- Publisher: Alien Images
- Platform: Acorn Archimedes
- Release: EU: 1990
- Genres: 3D, Role-playing
- Mode: Single player or Multi player

Starch is a computer game written by Mark Dixon in 1990 for the Acorn Archimedes computer. The objective of the game was to help the principal characters complete tasks related to laundry duties in the company in which they worked.

Starch was retailed through Dabs Press which was closely associated with the publisher Alien Images.

The game supported either one or two simultaneous players. It featured a 3D playing area, digitized sound, speech and music, and used a 256 color screen mode.

== Gameplay ==
Starch saw two manual workers, Harry and Dave, on a frantic clothes-cleaning night shift. The game supported either one or two simultaneous players. In addition to the two main characters the game also included a computer controlled character called Sam that attempted to stop the progress of the main characters. In one player mode the second character would be controlled by the computer.

There were five different levels to complete, each consisting of a specific task. In order to complete a task the player had to work out how to operate various pieces of machinery controlled by buttons, levers and ropes.

Each level ended when the available time expired or a specific 'Quota' had been met. Following the completion of each level the two characters would be shown in the manager's office. If the level had been successfully completed then they would jump up in the air in celebration. If the level had not been completed then the manager would pull a lever that caused a trap door to be opened below the player(s), while uttering the words "you're fired!"

== Reception ==
Starch was rated in the top ten games of 1990 by BBC Acorn User Magazine and described as probably the only original concept to have hit the games scene in that year, praising the replay value of the two-player mode.

Eurogamer also highlighted the unusual game premise, and described the freedom to choose between cooperative or competitive gameplay.
