= EE (telecommunications) =

British telecommunications company

EE Limited
- EE's logo since 2012
- Formerly: Everything Everywhere Limited (2010–2012)
- Type: Private
- Industry: Telecommunications
- Predecessor: Orange UK; T-Mobile UK
- Founded: 1 April 2010; 16 years ago
- Headquarters: London, England, UK
- Area served: United Kingdom
- Key people: Claire Gillies (CEO)
- Products: Fixed-line telephony; Mobile telephony; Broadband internet; Digital television
- Brands: Orange (2010–2015); T-Mobile (2010–2015)
- Parent: BT Consumer
- Website: www.ee.co.uk

EE Limited (formerly Everything Everywhere Limited) is a British mobile network operator and internet service provider, and a brand of BT Consumer, a division of BT Group. It was established in 2010 and is the third-largest mobile network operator in the United Kingdom, with 21.2 million customers as of September 2025.

It was originally formed in 2010 as a 50:50 joint venture between Deutsche Telekom and France Télécom (now Orange S.A.) following the merger of T-Mobile UK and Orange UK, their respective businesses in the UK; the former brands were phased out in 2015. The name was shortened to EE when the company concurrently launched the UK's first 4G mobile network in 2012. EE was acquired by BT in 2016 and became a new consumer division within the wider group.

EE has its headquarters in London, England, as well as hubs in Bristol, Darlington, Sunderland, Greenock, Merthyr Tydfil, North Tyneside, Plymouth and Leeds. As of November 2016, EE's 4G network coverage reached more than 99% of the UK population, with double speed 4G reaching 80%, while EE's 3G network reached 98% of the population until its closure at the start of 2024.

== History ==
=== Origins ===
Deutsche Telekom and France Télécom (now Orange S.A.) announced plans to merge their respective UK ventures – T-Mobile UK and Orange UK – on 8 September 2009.

T-Mobile UK was originally One2One, founded by Mercury Communications in 1993; the network was acquired by Deutsche Telekom in 1999 and adopted Deutsche Telekom's T-Mobile brand in 2002. Orange had launched its services in 1994 while under the ownership of Hutchison Whampoa.

The initial planning suggested a joint revenue of around £7.7 billion for 2008, with savings via synergies expected to total "over £445 million annually from 2014 onwards". The two companies also announced an expected investment of "£600 to £800 million in integration costs". A press release outlined a vision for the two brands, stating that "the T-Mobile UK and Orange UK brands will be maintained separately for 18 months". The merger was cleared by the European Commission on 1 March 2010; no new company was formed, but instead T-Mobile (UK) Limited was renamed to Everything Everywhere Limited in July.

The 50:50 joint venture was announced as completed on 1 April 2010, and the name Everything Everywhere was announced on 11 May 2010. On the same day, the company confirmed that "roaming across both networks [would be] due later in that year, at no additional cost to the customer" and further emphasised the separation of the brands, saying that each brand would maintain "its own shops, marketing campaigns, propositions and service centres".

=== 2010 to 2012: Everything Everywhere ===
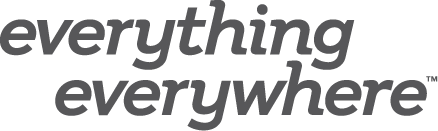
Logo of Everything Everywhere

The companies' network sharing plans (allowing Orange customers to utilise T-Mobile's 2G signal and vice versa) were released to customers in October 2010. The "switch-on" was rolled out utilising an opt-in page on each brand's website. However, the rollout did not initially include automatic network roaming mid-call or the two brands' 3G services.

In January 2011, Everything Everywhere and Barclaycard announced that they would be jointly introducing the UK's first contactless mobile payments system for consumers by early summer 2011. Everything Everywhere expanded its contactless mobile payments arm by announcing a deal with Mastercard in August 2012 that would see the two companies work together on introducing near-field communication (NFC) technology and other mobile payment technologies into the UK. Soon after, Everything Everywhere sustained its involvement in the future of NFC technology in the UK by announcing a joint venture between itself, Vodafone and O2. The joint venture was designed to be a "single point of contact" for all those involved in increasing the adoption of NFC for mobile payments in the UK.

On 18 July 2011, Tom Alexander announced unexpectedly that he would step down as CEO. Alexander had joined Orange in 2008 and had led the company since its formation in July 2010. It was announced that he would leave his post on 31 August 2011 and would be replaced by Olaf Swantee, who had held the position of Executive VP of European Activities and Sourcing for France Télécom in addition to being a member of EE's board. Alexander said that he would remain with the company throughout the remainder of 2011 and continue to advise Swantee in his new role. Swantee is seen as having done an exceptional job in leading the group through the challenges of rebranding and the launch of a new technology, and was named the mobile industry's person of the year in 2013 as a result.

In November 2011, Everything Everywhere announced plans to cut a further 550 back office staff, with its sites in Bristol, Darlington, Hatfield, and Paddington affected.

In April 2012, the T-Mobile network in Northern Ireland was switched off, meaning that customers there roamed onto Orange. Later, most T-Mobile sites were turned back on as EE has a mast sharing agreement with 3.

=== 2012 to 2014: Rebranding to EE ===
Alternative logo of EE

On 22 August 2012, Everything Everywhere announced that it would introduce a third brand as part of a future 4G launch to sit alongside T-Mobile and Orange, and that Everything Everywhere would continue as the company's legal name. Further speculation commenced on 7 September 2012 when the company announced details of a press conference on the morning of 11 September 2012, the earliest date set by Ofcom to launch 4G services. It was also noted that this date was only 24 hours earlier than the expected launch of the latest generation of iPhone (the iPhone 5), thereby arousing suspicion that the new iPhone would support 4G and that Everything Everywhere would launch its service on this widely anticipated handset. Other commentators suggested that the HTC One XL would be the first handset to launch utilising Everything Everywhere's 4G network. The handsets that the company initially launched on EE are the iPhone 5 (iOS), HTC One XL (Android), Samsung Galaxy S III (Android), Samsung Galaxy Note II (Android), Huawei Ascend P1 (Android), Nokia Lumia 920 (Windows Phone), Nokia Lumia 820 (Windows Phone). The company also announced that they would be using two 4G mobile broadband devices manufactured by Huawei - the E589 Mobile Wi-Fi device and E392 mobile broadband dongle.

On 11 September 2012, it was announced that the EE brand would be used to identify its network on all of the company's devices (EE, T-Mobile and Orange), alongside its 4G service and the company's fibre optic broadband roll-out. The brand was described by EE as The Super Fast Brand. It was also confirmed that all ex-T-Mobile and ex-Orange shops would be re-branded EE overnight, but mobile products would continue to be sold under those brands inside the stores. The company's legal name changed to EE Limited on 2 September 2013.

On 30 October 2012, it was announced that its Orange broadband service would be rebranded as EE, and the company would be launching a new fibre-optic broadband service, using a Bright Box router and Openreach GEA. The change took effect on 5 November 2012 through a firmware upgrade that replaced the Orange branding with EE on customers' router web interface. On 6 November 2012, it was announced that EE had exclusively partnered with mobile payments company iZettle. The agreement allowed EE to sell the company's mini debit/credit card readers which allow small business customers to make payments using their mobile phones. The devices initially went on sale in 297 EE stores and via EE's telesales channel.

In March 2014, EE began to phase out the T-Mobile and Orange brands in the UK, removing these products from their website and retail stores. However, these brands were still available via telesales and through third-party retail channels. The phase out was completed in March 2015, with new connections and upgrades only available on EE branded services.

=== 2014 to present: Acquisition by BT ===
During 2014, Deutsche Telekom and Orange S.A. were reported to be considering options to sell EE or divest it through an initial public offering. On 15 December 2014, BT confirmed it had entered into exclusive talks to buy EE for £12.5 billion. On 5 February 2015, BT confirmed it would be acquiring EE for £12.5 billion; subject to regulatory approval, and received final unconditional approval by the Competition and Markets Authority on 15 January 2016. The deal was completed on 29 January 2016 with Deutsche Telekom now owning 12% of BT, while Orange owns 4%.

On 1 February 2016, BT announced that EE will become a new consumer division within the wider group, alongside BT Consumer. It will serve customers with mobile services, broadband and TV, and also continue to deliver the Emergency Services Network contract which was awarded to EE in late 2015. EE's business division was brought together with BT Business and the UK-focused operations of BT Global Services to form a new BT Business and Public Sector division with around £5bn of revenues. Another new division, BT Wholesale and Ventures, comprised the BT Wholesale division along with EE's MVNO business as well as some specialist businesses such as Fleet, Payphones and Directories. Gerry McQuade, currently Chief Sales and Marketing Officer, Business at EE, will be its CEO.

On 28 July 2017, BT announced organisational changes to "simplify its operating model, strengthen accountabilities and accelerate its transformation" and involves bringing together its BT Consumer and EE divisions into a new unified BT Consumer division that will operate across three brands – BT, EE, and Plusnet. This took effect on 1 April 2018.

== Operations ==
=== Locations ===
==== Offices ====
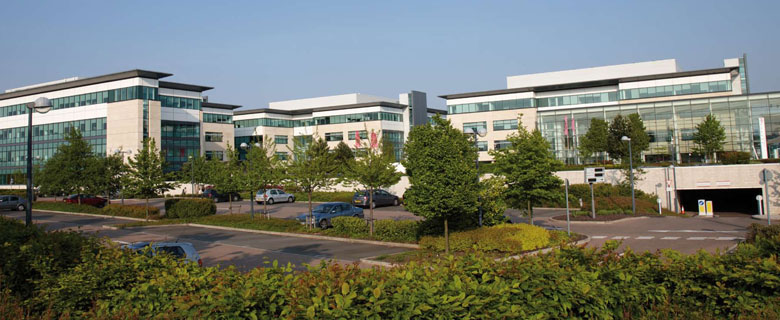
EE's former headquarters at Hatfield Business Park

EE has main offices in London, Bristol, Darlington, Doxford, Greenock, Merthyr Tydfil, North Tyneside, Plymouth and Leeds. In June 2016, it was announced that EE was making preparations to move from its offices in Paddington to BT Centre at the end of year, as part of BT's plans to save £360 million a year following its acquisition of EE. The move began in November 2016.

==== Retail shops ====
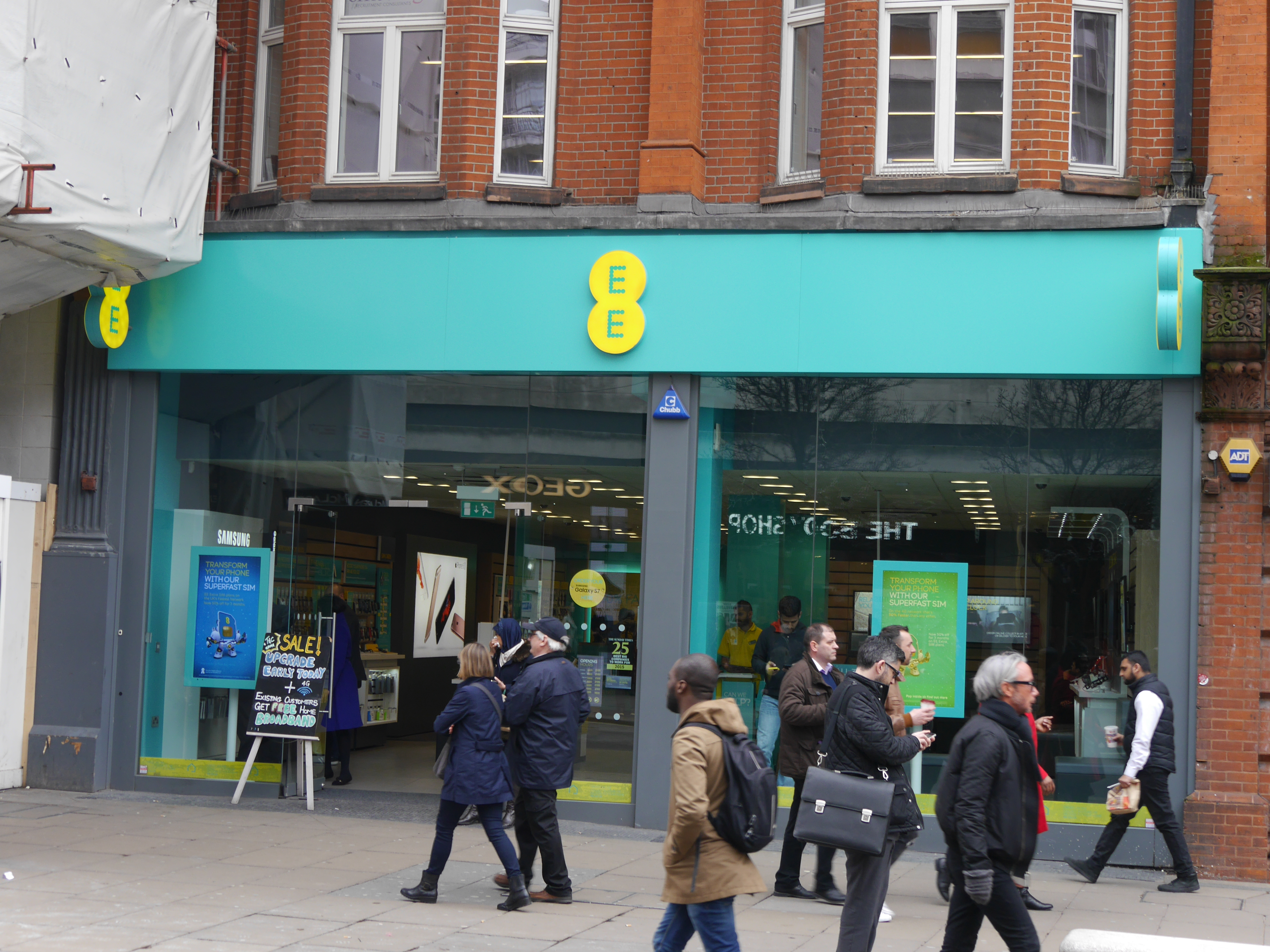
An EE shop in Oxford Street, London, 2016

In November 2010, EE announced the opening of six "dual-branded" shops: three were led by T-Mobile and three by Orange, and each promoted the other brand's products. The company expanded further in early 2011. Five new shops had an Everything Everywhere–branded fascia, although they represented and sold both T-Mobile and Orange. During the same quarter, the company also launched a number of Orange concessions in selected HMV shops. These were designed to operate as normal Orange retail shops, although with an expected lower footfall and designed to cater for HMV's younger consumers. The company removed these concessions from HMV shortly before the re-brand, with their approximately 100 staff transferred to local shops.

EE had 700 shops in the UK after the re-branding of existing Orange, T-Mobile, and Everything Everywhere shops in October 2012. In January 2013, it was announced that EE would close 78 shops, with no job losses, because in several locations there were two on the same street, often close together. In January 2014, it was announced that EE would close a further 76 duplicated shops and there would be 50 new ones, including 30 franchise outlets, estimated to create 350 jobs. The franchise outlets would grow to 100 by the end of the year, including the transfer of 45 directly managed shops to franchise partners. The move saw its number of shops reduce from 600 to 574 (including the 100 franchise outlets).

In September 2014, it was announced that following the collapse of Phones 4u in the UK, EE would acquire 58 of its shops for £2.5 million in a deal with its administrators, PricewaterhouseCoopers. The deal safeguarded 359 jobs and the shops would be rebranded to EE.

In July 2017, EE announced 100 store-within-a-store outlets by the end of 2019 via a partnership with Sainsbury's. This would create 400 jobs in Sainsbury's and Argos stores, and see the number of outlets reach close to 700, as part of its ambition to provide 95% of the population with access to an EE shop within 20 minutes' drive. In addition, pop-up shops and cabins would appear in shopping centres and other locations around the UK, and mobile EE shops in vans would serve customers in the most remote areas.

=== Network ===
EE owns and operates national 2G, 4G and 5G mobile phone networks in the UK.

On 22 June 2010, Everything Everywhere announced plans to roll out HD voice calling throughout its network by the end of summer. The technology was initially trialled on Orange's network in Bristol, Reading and Southampton, before it was expanded to the rest of the UK by the end of summer. Its request to use its surplus capacity to launch 4G services in the UK was approved by Ofcom on 21 August 2012. As part of Ofcom's approval of the company's roll-out of 4G, it was announced on 22 August 2012 that Hutchison 3G had acquired part of Everything Everywhere's 1,800 MHz spectrum.

EE's 4G network, along with its nationwide marketing campaign and store re-branding, was launched on 30 October 2012; it was the UK's first 4G mobile network, while other networks rolled out their 4G networks well into 2013. 4G coverage was initially "switched on" in 11 UK cities; London, Bristol, Birmingham, Cardiff, Edinburgh, Glasgow, Leeds, Liverpool, Manchester, Sheffield, and Southampton. During the latter part of 2012 and 2013, the company added more cities and towns, and planned to boost speeds in some existing locations by Summer 2013. EE claims 2,000 square miles (5,200 km^{2}) of 4G network would be added every month from launch and the goal was to cover 70 per cent of the population by the end of 2013, and 90 per cent by the end of 2014.

EE had early problems and issues of no signal across both its 3G and 4G networks with senior EE staff conceding they were facing 'teething problems'. On 20 February 2013, Ofcom announced that EE had been awarded more 4G spectrum in the 800 MHz and 2.6 GHz bands, bidding around £588 million for the spectrum. On 5 November 2013, EE began testing LTE Advanced (LTE-A) in East London Tech City. The LTE-A network offered speeds up to 300 Mbit/s when rolled out to the public in 2014. EE's LTE-Advanced was launched at the end of October 2014.

On 12 February 2016, EE announced that it had reached its 2015 targets to double the number of 4G users on its network to 14 million at the year's end and remains as Europe's largest 4G operator. Its 4G network now reaches more than 95% of the UK population, with double speed 4G reaching 80%. EE's 3G network reaches 98% of the population while its 2G network reaches 99%. On 24 April 2016, it was announced that as part of a new strategy, EE are aiming to extend the geographic reach of its 4G network in the UK from the current 60% to 95% by 2020, which will increase the proportion of the UK's population covered by the 4G network from 95% to 99.8%. In order to achieve this, EE will build more than 750 new sites. Its 4G network was switched on in Shetland and the Isles of Scilly, enabled by the fibre broadband links deployed by BT. Its 4G network at launch was only used for data connections, with customers moving to 3G while on a call, however EE have rolled out 4G Calling (VoLTE) across the UK to allow both voice and data over 4G as well as allowing customers to make calls in new areas of the network that are 4G-only. 4G Calling was first available in London, Birmingham, Bristol, Manchester, Edinburgh, Glasgow, Belfast, Leeds and Newcastle, and has been switched on across the rest of the network since July 2016.

On 13 September 2017, it was announced that EE are upgrading its 4G network by converting airwaves from 2G to 4G. It currently uses frequencies in the 1,800 MHz band for both 2G and 4G (its other bands are reserved solely for 3G/4G) and is converting – or 'refarming' 10 MHz of the 2G airwaves and adding that to the existing 20 MHz slice that's already configured for 4G. More than 600 sites across cities including London, Birmingham, Manchester, Edinburgh and Cardiff, will be upgraded with the latest 4G spectrum over the next six months, equipped with 'Cat 12' and 'Cat 16' modems which will provide better speeds and coverage and support next generation 'CAT 12' and 'CAT 16' smartphones. The data upload speeds will also be doubled from the current maximum of 50 Mbit/s to up to 100 Mbit/s on more than 900 sites across the UK. It is also expanding its UK-wide 4G+ with more than 1,000 sites supporting 'Cat 9' speeds above 400 Mbit/s. The geographic reach of its 4G network is now 85%.

On 19 March 2018, it was announced that EE had filled 12,000 km^{2} (4,600 square miles) of mobile not-spots in the last 12 months as part of its 4G geographic reach strategy of 95% by 2020, currently 90%. This involved upgrading more than 4,000 existing sites to provide 4G, and the construction of 105 new sites which are spread across Northern England, North Wales and Scotland and is in the process of building a further 350 new sites to continue filling in mobile not-spots. Many of these new sites are in areas that have previously had no coverage from any operator and have already carried more than 200 emergency 999 calls where people would have previously been unable to call for help. The new sites are being built to provide coverage for EE's customers and for the Emergency Services Network. The geographic reach of its 4G network in Scotland surpassed 75% at the end of 2017.

On 11 September 2018, it was announced that EE are upgrading its 4G network by converting airwaves from 3G to 4G. It currently uses frequencies in the 2,100 MHz band for 3G and is converting – or 'refarming' it for 4G. More than 500 sites will be upgraded in the next six months and are the busiest 'hotspots' in its network where there is the greatest demand for mobile data. These sites are spread across cities including London, Birmingham, Manchester, Bristol, Exeter, Hull, Nottingham, Edinburgh, Glasgow, Cardiff and Belfast. In addition to providing better speeds and reliability, these sites will provide five 'carriers' of 4G which is more than any other UK operator and accommodate the latest smartphones which can support connections to all five at the same time, with Five Carrier Aggregation (5 CA). It also lays the foundation for its 5G network that will be launched in 2019 where it will be built on top of the upgraded sites.

EE completed the switch-off of its 3G network in February 2024.

==== Smart number technology ====
On 11 June 2018, EE became the first UK network to launch smart number technology, allowing customers to use the same number across multiple devices in addition to their smartphones including tablets, smartwatches and laptops. It is available at no extra cost to new and existing customers and is part of its strategy to "keep customers connected by bringing together the best of mobile and broadband through first-of-their-kind converged services across the UK". It supports calls and texts across multiple devices and works even when they do not have their smartphone with them. It supports up to 5 other connected devices and will need to be internet connected via Wi-Fi or mobile, with the primary device being connected to the EE network for the service to work. Calls can be made on multiple devices at the same time, or handed off between devices.

It is available initially on Apple devices, with Android devices coming at a later date. Customers will need to be on an EE pay monthly plan on their smartphone with minimum iOS 11.3 on iPhone 6 or later. Paired iPads and Macs will need to be on minimum iOS 10 and OS X El Capitan respectively, iPod Touch with minimum iOS 10 and Apple Watch with minimum watchOS 2. EE is also the only UK network to support the full connected capability of the Apple Watch Series 3.

In December 2024, EE switched off Smart Number for its users, stating that iCloud calling and watch functionality wouldn't be affected by this change.

==== Virtual network agreements ====
The Co-operative Mobile operate on the EE network under a MVNO agreement, which was most recently renegotiated in December 2010 for Virgin, and November 2013 for Asda (which had previously operated on the Vodafone network, however the agreement ended in March 2021 where ASDA Mobile returned to using the Vodafone network).

BT Mobile and EE also have an MVNO agreement, which has allowed BT Mobile to offer packages since March 2014.

EE purchased LIFE Mobile in October 2014, a MVNO set up by Phones 4u in 2013 from PWC.

==== Mobile Broadband Network Limited ====
On 3 September 2010, Everything Everywhere announced that Orange would join Mobile Broadband Network Limited (MBNL), the 3G network sharing joint venture formed in December 2007 between T-Mobile UK and Hutchison 3G UK (H3G UK). MBNL would become a 50:50 joint venture between Everything Everywhere and Three UK, with Orange contributing several thousand of its base stations for network sharing purposes. MBNL was created after T-Mobile and Three UK agreed to pool their respective 3G infrastructures in a 50:50 joint venture. By September 2010 MBNL's HSPA-based infrastructure covered more than 90% of the British population, and was expected to rise to more than 98% by the end of 2010.

==== Radio frequency summary ====
Frequencies used on the EE network
Frequency	Band	Protocol	Class
1,800 MHz		GSM/GPRS/EDGE	2G
800 MHz	20	LTE/LTE Advanced	4G/4G+
1,800 MHz	3	LTE/LTE Advanced	4G/4G+
2,100 MHz	1	LTE/LTE Advanced	4G/4G+
2,600 MHz	7	LTE/LTE Advanced	4G/4G+
700 MHz	n28	NR	5G
1,800 MHz	n3	NR	5G
2,100 MHz	n1	NR	5G
2,600 MHz	n7	NR	5G
3,500 MHz	n78	NR	5G

=== Broadband ===
EE inherited the Orange UK broadband service, and as of April 2015 EE had around 900,000 broadband customers.

=== Television ===
EE launched a TV service for broadband customers in November 2014. Using an EE-branded set-top box, it offered standard Freeview channels through an aerial connection along with PVR features and catch-up TV services, competing against YouView. In June 2019, the service was replaced with a new package using an Apple TV box, which also gives access to BT Sport.

== Marketing ==
EE launched its first television advertisement on 3 November 2012, four days after the company launched its 4G services and new brand. The advertisements featured Kevin Bacon and his related Six Degrees of Kevin Bacon concept. The advert initially aired on ITV during The X Factor, on its Saturday evening slot on UK television. The adverts were filmed over two days during August 2012 in Lewes.

=== Sponsorships ===
EE began sponsoring the British Academy of Film and Television Arts awards in 2013, replacing its Orange brand.

A six-year agreement to sponsor Wembley Stadium was agreed with The Football Association in February 2014, although was not classed as a naming rights agreement.

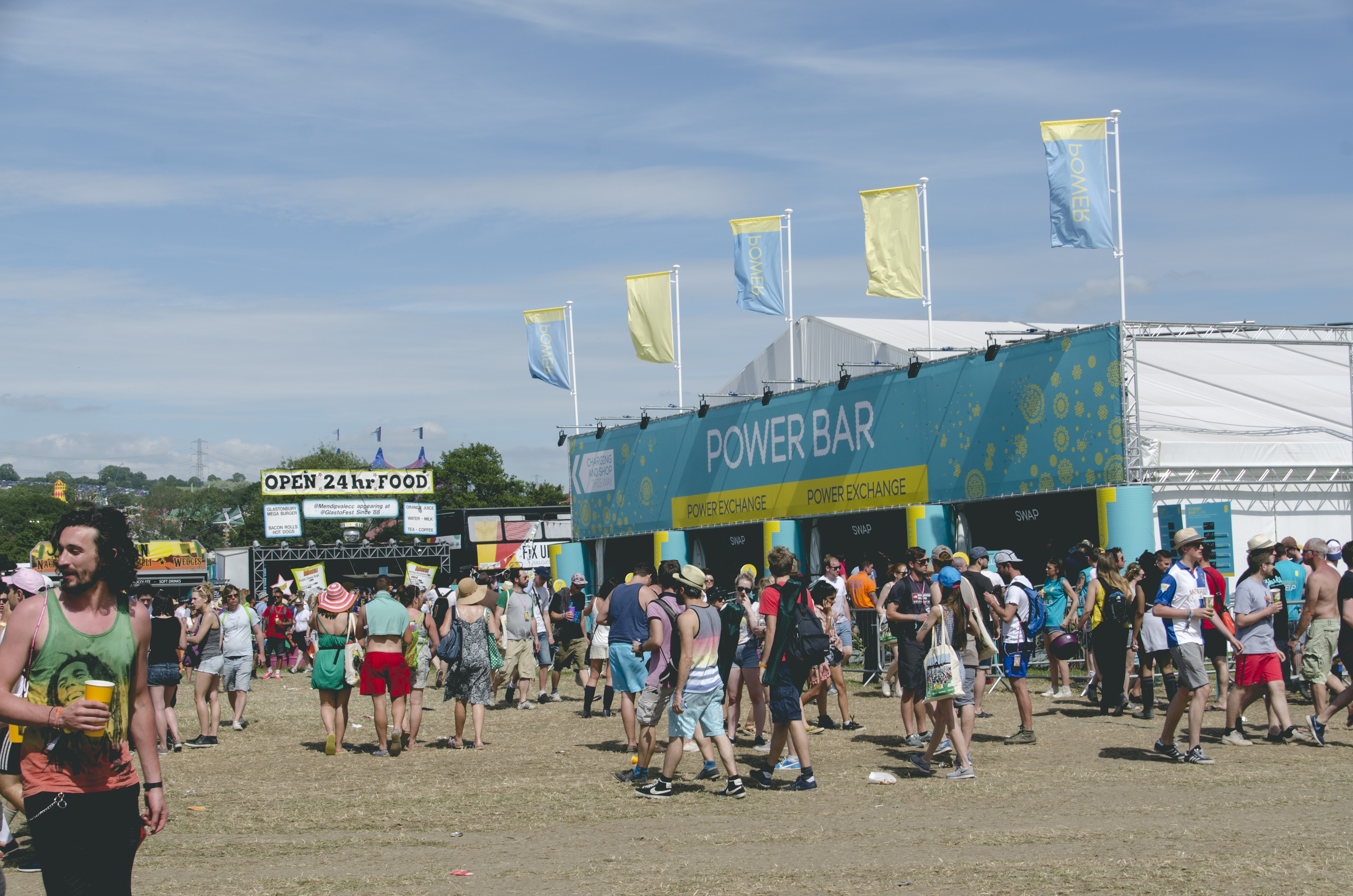
EE Power Bar at Glastonbury Festival of Contemporary Performing Arts 2015

EE had a presence at the Glastonbury Festival 2015, providing reusable chargers for mobile phone users. The "Power Bars" could be exchanged once a day, for a fully charged charger, at two locations around the festival.

== Criticism and controversies ==
In early 2013, Ipsos MORI signed an agreement with EE, wherein Ipsos MORI would commercialise the data on the company's 23 million subscribers, for example "how many of the phone users checked their Facebook accounts, or the website of their favourite shop". Later that year, The Sunday Times revealed that Ipsos MORI had negotiated an agreement to sell this data to the police and other parties. The data included "gender, age, postcode, websites visited, time of day text is sent [and] location of customer when call is made". When confronted by the paper, the police indicated that they would no longer go ahead with the deal. Ipsos MORI defended its actions, while EE refused to comment.

In August 2014, EE started a new service where customers could queue-jump when phoning EE customer services for a one-off cost of 50p to be fast tracked out of the queue to an available agent. This sparked outrage among consumers who viewed the option as at extortionate charge for being put through promptly to a member of staff; something which should be standard.

Later that month, EE was accused of trying to silence complaining customers on social media networks, such as Facebook and Twitter. Customers claimed that the company deleted their complaints on the company's Facebook page. The company discourages customers from posting their grievances in public, preferring private messages.

In May 2015, EE became the most complained-about consumer landline and broadband provider, according to regulator, Ofcom. Complaints against the UK's largest mobile operator related to topics ranging from line faults, service and provision issues to bill problems.

In January 2017, EE were fined £2.7 million by the regulator, Ofcom, for overcharging more than 32,145 customers. Users who called EE's customer services number whilst roaming within the EU had been charged as though they were calling from the United States. Despite calls to the EE telephone number from within the EU becoming free from 18 November 2015, EE continued to bill more than 7,600 customers until January 2016.

In May 2018, a security researcher discovered the company had failed to update the default administrator password on a code quality testing platform containing application source code and Amazon Web Services and API keys. The company issued a statement saying, "No customer data is, or has been, at risk", while the researcher pointed out that "malicious hackers could analyze the code of their payment systems, and find major holes that could lead to theft of payment information".

Later that month, EE blocked and removed a website after text messages claiming to be from EE were sent to customers offering 40 per cent off their monthly bills in celebration of the Royal Wedding. Customers took to social media to complain of the texts. The scam messages contained a link to a fake EE website, encouraging them to enter their personal details and card number. EE advised any customers who receive any messages to not click on any of the links, and delete the messages after forwarding them to 7726, Ofcom's anti-spam service.

In June 2021, EE was the first company to re-introduce roaming charges for its customers in the EU, after Brexit meant that EU roaming regulations no longer applied. A £2 daily fee will be charged to be able to use data/call/text allowances in EU destinations.

=== Loyalty penalty claim ===
In November 2025, the Competition Appeal Tribunal (CAT) approved a class action claim in the UK from consumer rights expert Justin Gutmann to take mobile network operators to court, including EE. The claim alleges that they were charging long standing customers for their mobile phones beyond their contractual terms. Gutmann is representing 10.9 million contracts that were affected between 1 October 2015 and 31 March 2025. The claim (if successful) could see EE, alongside other operators, paying over £1.1 billion in damages (£104 per contract). A significant amount of the claim was struck out, due to how long ago this occurred. The claim follows Citizens Advice complaining to the Competition and Markets Authority in September 2018. Mobile networks, including EE, deny any wrongdoing.
