= IPC Systems =

Telecommunications equipment vendor

IPC Systems, Inc.
- Company type: Private
- Industry: Trading Solutions and Private Network
- Founded: 1973; 53 years ago
- Headquarters: New York, Manhattan
- Number of employees: approximately 1,000
- Website: ipc.com

IPC Systems, Inc. is an American company headquartered in State Street, Manhattan, New York, that provides and services voice communication systems for financial companies. In 2014, IPC Systems employs approximately 1,000 employees throughout the Americas, EMEA and Asia-Pacific regions

IPC's products, called trading turrets, are specialized, multi-line, multi-speaker communications devices used by traders. Turrets can have access to hundreds of lines and allow traders to monitor multiple connections simultaneously to maintain communication with counterparties, liquidity providers, intermediaries and exchanges IPC's desktop system for traders provides multiple market data screens and gives traders the option to use instant messaging for colleague communications while checking on incoming calls.

In 2010, IPC was described by Waters Technology as the "Best Trading Turret Provider" Companies that provide similar services to IPC Systems include BT, Cloud9 and Orange Business Services

== History ==
IPC was founded as Interconnect Planning Corporation, a consulting company, in 1973. Its voice communication system was created after Republic National Bank approached IPC founder Stephan Nichols with a request to improve the bank's trading hardware

In 2000, IPC Systems and its subsidiary IXnet were purchased by Global Crossing.

Then, in 2001, IPC Systems was sold by Global Crossing and purchased by Goldman Sachs.

IPC was the first to use Voice over Internet Protocol (VoIP) on the trading floor; this reduced communication costs. The company introduced the first VoIP-based turret in 2001 and its second generation VoIP based turret, the IQ/MAX, in 2006.

Goldman Sachs sold the company to Silver Lake Partners in 2006 for $800 million. In 2014, Centerbridge Partners announced that it had agreed to acquire IPC Systems from Silver Lake Partners.

IPC Systems also developed a division called Positron Public Safety, which developed similar systems for use by 911 operators and other dispatchers. This was sold in 2008 to rival Intrado.

In 2015, IPC Systems acquired ASPone Networks, a global voice and data network provider to the financial markets.

In 2025, IPC Systems acquired Intracom Systems, a provider of software-based communications solutions.
