= David Gurle =

French entrepreneur and engineer

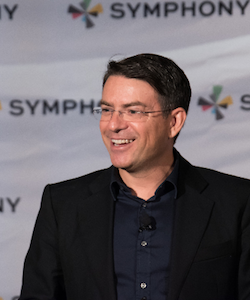
- David Gurle at Symphony Innovate 2016
- Born: David Gurlé; 1966 (age 59–60); Istanbul, Turkey
- Citizenship: French
- Occupation: Entrepreneur
- Known for: Founder and CEO of Symphony
- Website: www.symphony.com

David Gurle is a French entrepreneur and engineer, credited as one of the pioneers of IP communications. He is the founder and former CEO of Symphony Communication Services, LLC.

In June 2022, he's founded Hivenet (formerly Hive), a distributed compute and storage cloud using idle capacity of computing resources. In March 2025, David launched his next company, PoliCloud, a distributed and decentralized modular micro-datacenter infrastructure.

In 2026, Hivenet and PoliCloud merged with DataFactory to form Antimatter, of which David Gurle is now the CEO.

== Early life and education ==
The son of French and British diplomats, David spent his childhood between Turkiye, Syria and Lebanon. His family settled in Cannes when he was 14. He received his MSc. degree in computer science and telecommunication from French engineering school EFREI.

== Career ==
In 2014, David Gurle was appointed CEO of Symphony, following the acquisition of Perzo, a start-up he founded in Palo Alto, California in 2012. Perzo was a mobile and web messaging platform that encrypted every message end-to-end using a three-layer encryption system. Perzo's security model was based on customer-controlled encryption keys for businesses who need to maintain control and confidentiality over their communications. The platform also maintained compliance with privacy laws and various regulatory rules.

Prior to Symphony, David was General Manager and Vice President of Skype's Business unit.

In 2003 as Global Head of Collaboration Services at Reuters, David transitioned Reuters Messaging into a unified communications service. David connected Reuters Messaging with other messaging communities with the intention of improving workflow productivity of financial information workers.

After joining Microsoft in 1999, David Gurle founded and ran Microsoft's Real Time Communications business unit until 2003. He oversaw the development of the company's collaboration products including NetMeeting, Windows Messenger, Exchange IM, Exchange Conferencing Server, Live Communications Server and Office Communications Server. While at Microsoft, David co-authored several Internet Engineering Task Force standards for presence and instant messaging for SIP.

== Honors ==
In 2016, David was ranked #97 on "The New Establishment," Vanity Fair's "annual ranking of Silicon Valley hotshots, Hollywood moguls, Wall Street titans, and cultural icons."

In January 2020, David Gurle was awarded France's Légion d'Honneur by French president Emmanuel Macron.

== Publications ==
2007

L'essentiel de la VoIP - 2ème édition

2005

IP Telephony: Packet-based Multimedia Communications Systems

IP Telephony: Deploying Voice-over-IP Protocols by Olivier Hersent (2005-03-11)

Beyond VoIP Protocols: Understanding Voice Technology and Networking Techniques for IP Telephony

L'essentiel de la VoIP

2004

La voix sur IP Codecs, H.323, SIP, MGCP, déploiement et dimensionnement
