= Datastream =

Datastream is a type of broadband network connection in the United Kingdom. Datastream is a wholesale product in which the wholesale customer can purchase connectivity between their own point of presence and a number of end users. Some authors use the term "datastream" for replacing the term dataflow to avoid confusion with dataflow computing or dataflow architecture, based on an indeterministic machine paradigm (a research scene which is dead meanwhile).

== Technical details ==
The connections between the end users and the Other Logical Operator (OLO) (the wholesale customer of the DataStream product) were provided in three parts.

1. BT provided connectivity between the end user and the nearest BT Serving Exchange via asymmetric digital subscriber line, symmetric digital subscriber line, and fibre to the x. The end user access line could have a bandwidth ranging between 288 kbit/s and 8,128 kbit/s (8 Mibit/s) downstream and up to 832 kbit/s upstream for Asymmetric digital subscriber line, and up to 2048 kbit/s (2 Mibit/s) for Symmetric digital subscriber line. For fibre-based connections, speeds can be as high as 100 Mbit/s although most connections of this type are fibre from exchange to cabinet so therefore limited to a maximum of 40 Mbit/s.
2. For each serving exchange involved in providing end user access lines, a virtual path is provisioned to a BT ATM switch on BT's core network. A virtual path can range in size from 250 kbit/s to 34 Mbit/s. One or more Digital Subscriber Line Digital Multiplexers at the serving exchange combine the traffic from the end user access lines for delivery to the ATM switch.
3. From the BT switch, the traffic from the various virtual paths is combined and an ATM Customer Access Link (CAL) is used to connect to the Network Terminating Equipment (NTE) at the wholesale customer's point of presence.

== Comparison to IPStream and LLU ==
IPstream, DataStream, and local loop unbundling (LLU) are all products that can be used for the delivery of bit-stream products, but represent different degrees of involvement from BT. In the case of LLU, the OLO has direct access to the twisted pair delivered to the end-user's NTE and has near total control of the connection from end-to-end. With DataStream, BT still manages the DSL multiplexing equipment at the various local exchanges, and hands off the aggregated traffic to the OLO at one or a few points of presence. With IPStream, BT also provides the IP transport services
