= Hoot-n-holler =

Permanent open-circuit communications system

A hoot-n-holler (also known as a squawk box system, a holler down, a shout down or a junkyard circuit, and abbreviated as hoot or shout) is a type of telecommunications system where there is a permanent open circuit between two or more parties. Any user can speak at any time and be heard over the system immediately and as such there is no need to pick up a phone, press a button or perform any other separate activation function.

Among other uses, it is popular with stock brokerage and other financial trading operations, as well as warehouse intercom applications. Users may have a speaker box which broadcasts live sound from remote locations, and such a system gives immediate access to other users in real time. Hoot-n-holler capability provides a tightly targeted method of communication that can support thousands of users worldwide and is a critical component of voice trading systems. Modern hoot-n-holler systems are frequently based on IP multicast. Using IP means old analog dedicated circuits can be removed, eliminating their associated cost. Either way, the hoot system can be broadcast over traditional microphone and speaker box hardware, or through a trading turret or other office phone system.

After the 1987 Stock Market Crash, regulatory authorities in the United States created a hoot-n-holler-based communication system known as INFOE to provide a continuous link between NASDAQ, security exchanges, and futures markets. This system allowed the various exchanges to instantly communicate current prices and other critical information during steep market declines.

== See also ==
- Trading turret
