= Symphony Communication =

Instant messaging service

Symphony
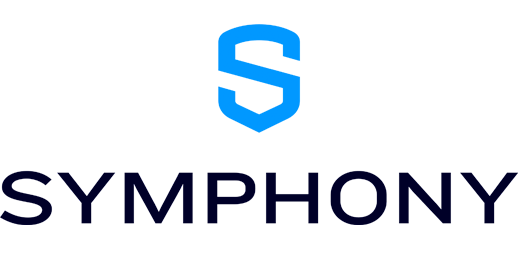
- Industry: Financial Technology
- Genre: Communication software
- Website: www.symphony.com

Symphony is an instant messaging and communication service designed for use by financial firms. The software features include workplace chat, voice calling, video conferencing, encryption, and support for third-party plugins.

Symphony Messaging can integrate with mobile messaging platforms such as WhatsApp, SMS, WeChat and LINE, and with team collaboration platforms such as Microsoft Teams and Zoom.

Symphony is developed by Symphony Communication Services.

== History ==
The technology was initially developed by Goldman Sachs as an internal messaging system called Live Current. In October 2014, Goldman Sachs and 14 other financial institutions invested $66 million to establish Symphony Communication Services LLC and acquire Perzo, Inc., a secure communication application known for its end-to-end encryption messaging.

Perzo was founded by David Gurle in 2012, and he served as Symphony's CEO from 2014 to 2021. Gurle played a role in developing communication solutions for Skype, Thomson Reuters, and Microsoft.

Symphony 2.0 was announced during the company's annual Innovate Conference in New York City in October 2019. The release of software components called Elements aimed to facilitate the development of custom applications on the Symphony platform. Symphony 2.0 was launched one year later.

By 2020, Symphony claimed to have amassed over 400,000 users on its platform.

In June 2021, Brad Levy assumed the role of CEO, after former founder David Gurle stepped down from the executive position. Levy had previous experience working at Goldman Sachs and IHS Markit before joining Symphony.

In January 2026, Ben Chrnelich became Symphony’s CEO and president, after 7 years at the company.

== Funding ==
In September 2014, fifteen financial firms, including Bank of America, BNY Mellon, Citi, Credit Suisse, HSBC and JPMorgan made investments in Symphony.

In October 2015, Symphony announced a successful funding round of $100 million, led by Google. UBS, Société Générale, Lakestar, Natixis, and other firms also participated in the investment.

In May 2017, Symphony secured an additional $63 million in funding from BNP Paribas and existing investors, resulting in a total valuation of the company surpassing $1 billion.

In June 2019, Symphony announced a funding round of $165 million with a valuation of $1.4 billion. Standard Chartered, MUFG Innovation Partners, and other undisclosed current and new investors contributed to the funding. The valuation made Symphony a tech unicorn, a privately held company with a valuation over $1 billion.

== Acquisitions ==
On November 28, 2014, Symphony Communication Services LLC completed the acquisition of technology assets from Collaboration Services, the open messaging network developed by Markit Ltd. The financial details of the transaction were not disclosed.

On August 2, 2021, Symphony Communication Services LLC acquired StreetLinx, a professional directory and counterparty mapping platform.

On November 29, 2021, Symphony Communication Services LLC acquired Amenity Analytics, a natural language processing (NLP) data analytics solution.

== Cloud9 ==
On June 24, 2021, Symphony Communication Services LLC acquired Cloud9 Technologies, a voice trading turret phone system used by financial traders. Cloud9 was launched in 2014, built on Web Real-Time Communication (WebRTC). Early customers included JP Morgan, Icap, and Barclays. Cloud9’s main competitors are IPC Systems and BT.

Cloud9 is a cloud-native Voice over IP (VoIP) service that requires no physical hardware, however optional hardware is available To meet regulatory compliance demands of the financial trading industry, Cloud9 features voice-to-text transcription and storage.

During the annual Symphony Innovate event on May 21, 2025, the firm announced the Cloud9 mobile app. Features of Cloud9 Mobile include voice calling, activity notifications, and a peer-to-peer network directory. It was already being trialled by some of the firm’s customers.

== Security ==
Symphony’s infrastructure is hosted on Google Cloud and Amazon Web Services. Web servers and databases are load-balanced across multiple zones for reliability.

Symphony Messaging uses end-to-end encryption for all messages and attachments. Conversation encryption keys are computed in Symphony’s Key Manager using Symphony’s patented cryptographic protocol. Encryption keys are then securely exchanged between Symphony’s key management and authorized participants, which employs a key encapsulation mechanism to ensure encryption keys remain perpetually inaccessible to Symphony.

Symphony’s patented “cryptographic isolation protocol” ensures that data is encrypted and accessible only to authorized participants, whilst simultaneously allowing the necessary governance controls for regulatory compliance.

In May 2025, Symphony announced Confidential Cloud, a secure messaging and voice platform that uses AI for enhanced security and operational efficiency. The fully managed cloud solution employs key management, and eliminates the need for on-premise components.

== Regulatory Compliance ==
Financial regulatory authorities issue fines for off-channel communication recordkeeping violations. In September 2022, Wall Street firms were fined a total of $1.8 billion by the SEC and CFTC, for failure to preserve staff discussing business matters over text messages and WhatsApp. In August 2024, the SEC fined 26 firms a combined total of $390 million for failure to maintain and preserve electronic communications, in contravention of SEC Rule 17a-4.

Symphony Messaging users can communicate over external messaging platforms such as WhatsApp, while communication data is captured and stored. The archiving function provides an auditable storage of business-related electronic communications, in compliance with Digital Communications Governance and Archiving (DCGA) requirements.
