= BT Broadband =

Broadband service offered by BT Group in the United Kingdom

- Type: Broadband
- Founder: Sir William Fothergill Cooke, George Parker Bidder, and Joseph Lewis Ricardo.
- Headquarters: UK, London
- Revenue: (20,845 (2022))
- Owner: BT Group
- Website: www.bt.com

BT Broadband is a broadband service offered by BT Consumer; a division of BT Group in the United Kingdom. It was formerly known as BT Total Broadband, BT Yahoo! Broadband and BT Openworld. With the introduction of BT Infinity, the Broadband package now refers to the legacy ADSL broadband products, such as ADSL Max and ADSL2+.

== BT Home Hub ==
The BT Home Hub is a Wireless Internet router from BT. It is based on the IEEE 802.11g (WiFi) standard and also supports IEEE 802.11b devices. It is significant as it marks BTs departure away from traditional telecommunications services and towards Internet and media products. It supports VoIP Internet calls and is compatible with existing DECT handsets. It works with the existing BT Fusion service and works with the BT Vision video on demand service. The device connects to the Internet using a standard ADSL connection. It will be able to support the WBC products using ADSL2+ (up to 24 Mb) when BT Wholesale launches them in April 2008. BT launched a new look Home Hub in October 2007 with an enhanced wireless footprint. In July 2008 the Home Hub was relaunched with a new smaller design, Draft-N wireless, additional connections and a new user interface; unlike the previous replacement, the new Home Hub was given a .0 release, making it the Home Hub 2.0.

== BT Infinity ==
In January 2010, BT launched a new product called BT Infinity. 4 million homes in the UK are covered by this service. Most homes will get FTTC service and have up to 40 Mbit/s broadband, while those with FTTP will get 100 Mbit/s and a 20 GB monthly usage allowance in 2010, with an unlimited package also offered. BT have since rolled out Infinity 2.

== See also ==
- BT Group
- BT Infinity
- BT TV
