= BT Global Services =

UK telecommunications company

BT International
- Type: Division
- Industry: Telecommunications
- Founded: July 2000; 26 years ago
- Headquarters: One Braham Street, London, United Kingdom
- Number of locations: 180 countries
- Area served: Worldwide
- Key people: Martijn Blanken (CEO)
- Products: Network security Cloud computing Contact centres Unified communications IT and network services
- Number of employees: 8,455
- Parent: BT Group
- Website: international.bt.com

BT Global, currently operating as BT International, is a division of the British telecommunications company BT Group that provides global security, cloud, and networking services to multinational companies worldwide, with operations in 180 countries. It was established in July 2000 as BT Ignite.

== History ==
=== Renaming ===
BT Group began operating as a private corporation after the Telecommunications Act 1984.

During the 1990s, between the loosening of national telecom monopolies and the current (largely) liberalised market, BT Group entered into a number of alliances in order to serve its mainly, then, UK-based multi-national customers. From the 90's through the early 2000s, BT Group, then known as British Telecom, struggled. The company failed to secure a strong partner, struggled to expand internationally, and had significant debt.

In 2002, the attempt at an alliance (Concert 2 with AT&T) was disbanded. Thereafter, the company brought together a number of joint ventures, partly owned assets and wholly owned subsidiaries into the single entity that exists today.

On 1 April 2002, BT's contracts with former Concert customers were transferred to BT Global and BT Retail. BT Ignite was renamed BT Global in April 2003. By late 2003, around 50% of BT Global's ~5,000 staff members were employed outside the UK.

=== Acquisitions ===
Between 2002 and 2009, the Global division made a string of acquisitions to expand its global footprint and broaden its business offer to customers. Most notable are Radianz, the then network arm of Reuters in 2005; the global network operator Infonet in 2005; managed security market leader Counterpane in 2006; US IT consultancy company International Network Services Corp. (INS) in 2007; and Asian systems integrator Frontline in 2008. In 2016, Global signed an agreement to acquire IP Trade S.A., a provider of unified communications and collaboration services for trading floor environments and command-and-control dispatch centres.

=== Consolidation ===
On 16 December 2022, BT announced the merger of Global with Enterprise to form a new division, BT Business, in an effort to save £100 million annually by the end of FY 2025-26. The new division was to be led by Bas Burger.

=== Demerger ===
On 2 June 2025, BT launched BT International, a new standalone division for serving its international customers.

== Customers ==
In 2005, Global won a multi-year worldwide outsourcing contract to provide communication and IT services to FIAT in a deal worth €450 million (£303 million) over five years across 40 countries. BT also acquired Fiat's subsidiary Atlanet for €80 million which provided domestic telecoms services to Fiat and other business customers across Italy. In 2006, Atlanet was merged with Albacom to form BT Italia.

In 2006, Global agreed a £100 million seven-year worldwide outsourcing contract to provide communication and IT services to PepsiCo across their 900 locations in more than 60 countries, as well as upgrading their network infrastructure.

In 2008, Global agreed a $650 million (£332 million) five-year worldwide outsourcing contract to provide communication and IT services to Procter & Gamble across more than 1,100 locations in more than 80 countries.

In January 2016, Global agreed a £100 million seven-year contract with the BBC to provide its broadcast network from April 2017, when it finishes its remaining contract with Vodafone UK via Atos. The deal will see the BBC move to a new, state-of-the-art network that will link all BBC UK sites, including 21 broadcasting centres and local radio stations, as well as connecting to the main overseas bureaux and partners for playout of the BBC's TV channels. It will carry all video, audio and data traffic, as well as fixed-line telephony, ISDN and broadband services.

On 10 February 2016, Global announced it has been awarded a five-year contract worth more than £9 million, to deliver computer and data center services to Bromley London Borough Council. The contract was won by BT as part of a pan-London framework agreement for information and communications technology (ICT) services set up by Westminster City Council, the Royal Borough of Kensington and Chelsea and Hammersmith and Fulham councils.

Global also managed the global networked IT estates for Komatsu and Randstad NV.

In January 2019, BT became the first international group to receive two national telecoms licenses from China's Ministry of Industry and Information Technology which enabled it to directly sell services to Chinese customers.

== Finances ==
At the start of 2009, Global took a £340m writedown due to poor "cost controls" shortly after the resignation of its CEO François Barrault. Later in the year the company reported losses of £2.1bn, despite sales of £8.8 billion. Global then underwent a transformation programme, including cost saving initiatives, leading to substantial increases of EBITDA, operating profits and operating cash flow during its 2009–2010 financial year. In May 2010, BT announced an investment plan to increase its capabilities in the Asia-Pacific region. By the end of its 2010–2011 financial year, Global had increased orders with customers by 10% year on year, improved profitability, and became operating cash flow positive a year ahead of schedule.

Total income for Global in 2016-7 was more than £5bn.

In 2017-2018 financial year, Global reported a £5bn revenue, £434m EBITDA and £10m operating profit.

== Future ==
On 29 June 2026, BT Group and Verizon agreed to combine their international operations in a 50:50 joint venture, creating a new company focused on serving multinational customers.
