= 1-5-7-1 =

Name of a family of calling features in the United Kingdom

1-5-7-1 is a family of calling features in the United Kingdom, for residential and business telephone lines and for mobile telephones, that are provided by BT Group and several other telephone service providers. The family is named after the telephone number 1571, the special service number that is used to access it. Call Minder is the name of BT's highest level of 1571 service.

== Landlines ==
The 1571 feature was introduced by BT Group to the UK in the 1990s after they digitised all the telephone exchanges. As of 2006 several other telephone service providers in the British Isles also provided 1571 answering services, including One.Tel, Platinum Telecom, Kingston Communications, and Manx Telecom. Most such providers rely on a local loop that is owned by BT Group. However, it is also available from providers that have their own local loops, such as Virgin Media.

In 2001, BT Group launched its Answer 1571 service as a free service, available at no extra cost to its existing telephone line customers. In 2007 a charge of £1 was introduced for any month in which two chargeable calls are not made on the line (this might apply, for instance, to people who have Carrier preselect with another telephone company). In 2014 a monthly charge (£2.25 as of 2016) was introduced for all residential users of the service, and the charge for not making two chargeable calls in any month (which had increased to £2) was removed. The Answer 1571 service, a cut-down version of BT Group's Call Minder service, allows a calling party to leave messages when the called party is engaged or does not answer within a fixed number of rings. The system allows for the storage of up to 20 messages, each of which can be up to 2 minutes long, for up to 60 days (or 20 days once they have been heard). To indicate to called parties that they have waiting messages, the exchange sends an interrupted dialling tone to them when they take their telephone off-hook. The called party can retrieve the messages by dialling 1571.

A significant advantage of 1571 answering services over answering machines is that messages can be recorded when the called party is engaged on another call, in addition to when the call is not answered. This is particularly useful when long calls are made, e.g., on long dialled-up Internet sessions.

Disadvantages of Answer 1571:

- it can cause problems for computer telephone line modems, which are unable to recognise the interrupted dialling tone as a dialling tone and which will thus refuse to make outgoing calls, reporting being unable to detect a dialling tone (although many modems allow "blind dialling", without trying to detect a dialling tone);
- it costs the calling party the minimum connection charge (often comprising a Call Set-Up fee plus a 1-minute call charge) to discover that the called party is engaged, even if they do not wish to leave a message, whereas obtaining the engaged tone incurs no connection charge. The Gosport & Fareham branch of the Multiple Sclerosis Society, as well as several others, recommends as a tip for saving money when making telephone calls to "count six rings and hang up before the expensive voice starts charging you";
- the caller cannot set a Ring Back if urgent contact with the called party is required;
- many answering machines implement call screening, which 1571 cannot do: the answering machine picks up the call with its speaker active, so that the user, if available, can listen to what the caller says, and pick up the phone only if they want to speak with the caller;
- some machines can record conversations; 1571 cannot.

To supplement the Answer 1571 services, BT provides additional services at an extra charge: the 1571 Text Alerts service sends a text message to a designated mobile telephone number whenever a new message is left. Another service was withdrawn in March 2009: 1571 Online allowed customers to retrieve their stored messages via the World Wide Web.

A problem with the 1571 Text Alerts system that was not stated on BT's website as of 7 June 2007 is that if a mobile phone number is transferred from another provider to either Virgin or T-mobile, the alert system will not work; phone messages will be stored, but text message alerts will not be sent.

As of December 2016 BT offers two services accessed by dialling 1571. Messages can be accessed by dialling in with an identification number, and a personal greeting can be recorded. Neither of the services can be disabled or re-enabled by the user, but must be cancelled or ordered, with a lag of several days.

- Answer 1571, £2.25/month. Calls answered after typically 7 rings. Up to 20 messages stored for up to 60 days.
- Call minder, £4.50/month, as above but 30 five-minute messages, stored for 30 days, can answer immediately or after a short, medium, or long period (typically 4, 7, or 10 rings), and can store numbers of callers who leave no message.

The number of rings before answering is not guaranteed, and may vary to some extent. This can be a problem if an answering machine is used on a line with a 1571 service (which cannot be temporarily disabled), with the intention that messages will be recorded on the machine; it is necessary to ensure that the machine answers before 1571 does.

== Mobile telephones ==
To its mobile telephone business customers BT Group provides a 1571 Voicemail service, which is similar to the service provided to landlines. Calling parties can leave messages when the mobile telephone is switched off, when it is in an area of reduced coverage, when it is on another call, or when the call is not answered within a fixed number of rings.
