= BT Superfast Fibre =

Broadband service in the United Kingdom

BT Superfast Fibre (formerly BT Infinity) is a broadband service in the United Kingdom provided by BT Consumer, the consumer sales arm of the BT Group. The underlying network is fibre-to-the-cabinet (FTTC), which uses optical fibre for all except the final few hundred metres (yards) to the consumer, and delivers claimed download speeds of "up to 76 Mbit/s" and upload speeds of "up to 19 Mbit/s" depending on package selected. The fibre terminates in a new roadside cabinet containing a DSLAM, from where the final connection to the customer uses VDSL2 technology.

Ofcom data gathered in November 2014 indicated that only 1% of 76 Mbit/s and 15% of 38 Mbit/s customers received the advertised speed. It adopted its present name on 23 May 2018 as part of BT's renaming of its entire broadband portfolio which is "designed to be simpler and more descriptive".

== Deployment ==
Following a technical trial involving 50 homes in Foxhall, Ipswich, in January 2009, and operational pilots at the Muswell Hill, Whitchurch and Glasgow Halfway telephone exchanges, the service was launched commercially on 25 January 2010. When it was announced, BT expected 4 million customers for the service by the end of the year. Infinity forms part of BT's £1.5bn plan to make superfast broadband available to 40% of the UK by the summer of 2012, using FTTC and FTTP services. Previously, the only major provider of domestic super fast broadband in the UK was Virgin Media's hybrid fibre-coaxial service. Neither Virgin Media nor BT's 'up-to 76 Mbit/s' Infinity actually use optical fibre to supply super fast broadband to the home.

== Wholesale competition ==
The fibre infrastructure is installed and maintained by Openreach, and is available for use by non-BT ISPs either directly from Openreach, or from BT Wholesale as part of the WBC product family.

== Demand ==
BT Retail ran a competition called "Race to Infinity" in the autumn of 2010 to assess demand for the Infinity product in 2495 mostly-rural communities. The winners would be the 5 areas served by a telephone exchange that received the most percentage votes out of its "total connections" by 31 December 2010.

BT announced on 3 January 2011 that 6, not the originally planned 5, areas would receive Infinity by early 2012. The six winning areas were: Whitchurch, Hampshire (104%); Caxton, Cambridgeshire (103%); Madingley, Cambridgeshire (102%); Innerleithen, Scottish Borders (101%); Blewbury, Oxfordshire (99.8%); Baschurch, Shropshire (95%).

Voting surpassed 100% in several areas because new places had been built and residents without landlines connected to the area's exchange could vote - and were encouraged to do so by very active locally-run volunteer campaigns.

In addition to winning Infinity, each of the six winning areas are to receive £5,000 of computer equipment for a local community project. BT originally planned on awarding the prize to just 1 of the top 5 winners.

As of February 2015, many properties in the small village of Baschurch were still waiting for BT to install BT Infinity.

An area's exchange had to get a minimum of 1,000 votes in order to enter the competition; any area whose exchange reached 75% would be actively engaged with by BT for an upgrade. Two exchanges outside the top 6 winners achieved over 75%: Marton, Warwickshire; and Capel, Surrey.

On 2 February 2011, BT announced that all 10 exchanges would be upgraded.

In March 2012, BT announced that they would be upgrading all of their packages to take advantage of their newer and much faster 100 Mbit/s fibre-optic technology. Areas are expected to be upgraded within the upcoming months.

On 25 September 2012, BT announced 163 new fibre exchanges. They are all expected to be activated sometime during 2013. Among the list, is Blackpool, Lancashire, Desford, Leicestershire, Earl Shilton, Leicestershire, Oakengates, Shropshire, Skegness, Torquay, Cowdenbeath, Fife, Christchurch, Dorset, Buckhaven, Fife and Dursley.

In December 2012, BT had begun the first real-world tests of newer XGPON technology, developed by BT and ZTE collectively, to allow superfast fibre-optic broadband up to 10 Gbit/s (10,000 Mbit/s). The testing is currently being held at Arcol UK in Cornwall and will operate in tandem with its current 330 Mbit/s downlink package.

On 13 February 2013, BT announced 99 new fibre exchanges. They are all expected to be activated by the end of 2014. Among the list, is Beamish, Birtley, Tyne and Wear, Darlington, Coatbridge, Grimsby and Yapton.

== Criticism ==
BT have received objections to the siting of various road-side boxes that are being installed for BT Infinity. Objectors are not opposed to the new technology, but propose that better locations could be found for the boxes. The green BT Infinity boxes are similar to existing street side cabinets but are taller and wider than existing units, with some models being 1.6 metres (5.2 ft) tall.

BT has also being widely criticised for upgrading telephone exchanges to support BT Infinity but then failing to upgrade all 'less profitable' cabinets. BT does not make cabinet upgrade plans public knowledge.

== National security threats and personal privacy ==
Between 2010 and 2012 the UK intelligence community initiated an investigation aimed at Huawei, the Chinese supplier of BT's new fibre infrastructure, of which BT Infinity is a part, with increasing urgency after the US, Canada and Australia prevented the company from operating in their countries. Although BT had notified the UK government in 2003 of Huawei's interest in their £10b network upgrade contract, what they did not do was raise the security implications as BT failed to explain that the Chinese company would have unfettered access to critical infrastructure. On 16 December 2012 David Cameron was supplied with an in-depth report indicating that the intelligence services had very grave doubts regarding Huawei, in that the UK governmental, military, business community and private citizen's privacy may be under serious threat. Subsequently, BT's Infinity program and other projects are now under urgent review.

On 7 June 2013, British lawmakers concluded that BT should never have allowed the Chinese company access to the UK's critical communications network without ministerial oversight, saying they were 'deeply shocked' that BT did not inform government that they were allowing Huawei and ZTE, both foreign entities with ties to the Chinese military unfettered access to critical national systems. Furthermore, ministers discovered that the agency with responsibility to ensure Chinese equipment and code, was 'threat-free' was entirely staffed by Huawei employees. Subsequently, parliamentarians confirmed that in case of an attack on the UK there was nothing at this point that could done to stop Chinese infiltration attacking critical national infrastructure.

Another Chinese company ZTE supplying extensive network equipment and subscriber hardware to BT Infinity is also under scrutiny after the US, Canada, Australia and the European Union declared the company a security risk to its citizens.

== See also ==
- BT TV
- Next generation access
