= BT Wholesale and Ventures =

UK telecommunications company

- Company type: Division
- Industry: Telecommunications
- Successor: BT Enterprise
- Headquarters: BT Centre; London, EC1; United Kingdom
- Area served: United Kingdom
- Products: Telephony; Broadband; Digital television IT and network services Payphones; Directory solutions Home security Fleet management Supply chain management
- Services: Wholesale leasing
- Parent: BT Group
- Website: www.btwholesale.com

BT Wholesale and Ventures was a division of United Kingdom telecommunications company BT Group that provided voice, broadband, data, hosted communication, managed network and IT services to communications providers (CPs) in Great Britain. It was merged with BT's Business and Public Sector division to form BT Enterprise in October 2018.

Wholesale and Ventures provided services to BT's other divisions: BT Consumer, BT Business and Public Sector and EE. It also offered services to media companies and broadcasters, and its ventures side offered a range of products and services. It provided the voice services to UK customers via 999, 118 500 and Next Generation Text Service, which helps those who can’t hear or speak on the phone.

In April 2018, Gavin Patterson, then BT Group's CEO, announced Wholesale and Ventures was to be combined with the group's Business and Public Sector division into a newly-formed division, BT Enterprise. It came after BT's decision to undertake a streamlining of its operations, in a bid to strengthen its offerings as a business.

Prior to its merger with Business and Public Sector, Wholesale and Ventures was formerly known as BT Wholesale, taking on the name following BT's new organisational structure that took effect in April 2016 after its acquisition of EE, and comprises the existing BT Wholesale division along with EE's mobile virtual network operator business as well as some specialist businesses such as Fleet, Payphones and Directories. Its ventures side included the following businesses at time of its restructuring:

- BT Redcare – protects homes and businesses in the UK against intruders, accidental fire or arson
- BT Cables – supports and supplies a range of cables and accessories
- Directory Solutions - the sole distributor of the UK’s directory information to producers of directory products and services
- BT’s Phone Book – the only UK directory that includes business and residential listings
- Payphones (Red telephone box, KX series, LinkUK) – handles telephone calls and provides additional services such as advertising, cash machines, Wi-Fi and small cell mobile hotspots
- BT Supply Chain – provides supply chain management for both Group businesses and its external customer base

== Products ==
=== Wholesale Broadband Connect ===
Wholesale Broadband Connect (WBC) is BT Wholesale's up-to-24 Mbit/s ADSL2+ offering in the UK. WBC replaced the ADSL Max product.

It also refers to BT's native fibre-to-the-premises service.

==== IPstream ====
IPstream is the most highly used wholesale broadband Internet service in the UK. BT Wholesale sells the service to ISPs and IPTV providers, who use it to provide ADSL services to customers over Openreach telephone lines.

The IPstream product covers the transport of data between the end-user's premises and an interconnect point of the ISPs choice, such as their main colocation facility, which is served by one or more links called BT Centrals. BT has operational control of the network for tasks such as load balancing. Transit of data to and from the internet, along with other services such as email servers, are the responsibility of the ISP.

IPStream is widely used by ISPs because it is cheaper to set up and costs less in maintenance than the ISP building its own network. This is balanced by the fact that usage costs for ISPs are higher using IPstream than their own network. Datastream is the similar system where ISPs in the UK use BT equipment but use their own IP transport.

BT Wholesale pays Openreach for access to the local loop and the exchange. The alternative to IPStream is local-loop unbundling, in which the ISP obtains these facilities from Openreach directly, and makes its own arrangements for onward carriage of the data stream.

Similar services are offered in other countries where there is a single dominant telecommunications provider, such as wholesale DSL from Telstra in Australia.

IPstream has largely been retired by BT in favour of its Wholesale Broadband Connect.
