= BT Italia =

Italian telecommunications company

BT Italia S.p.A.
- BT’s logo used since 2019

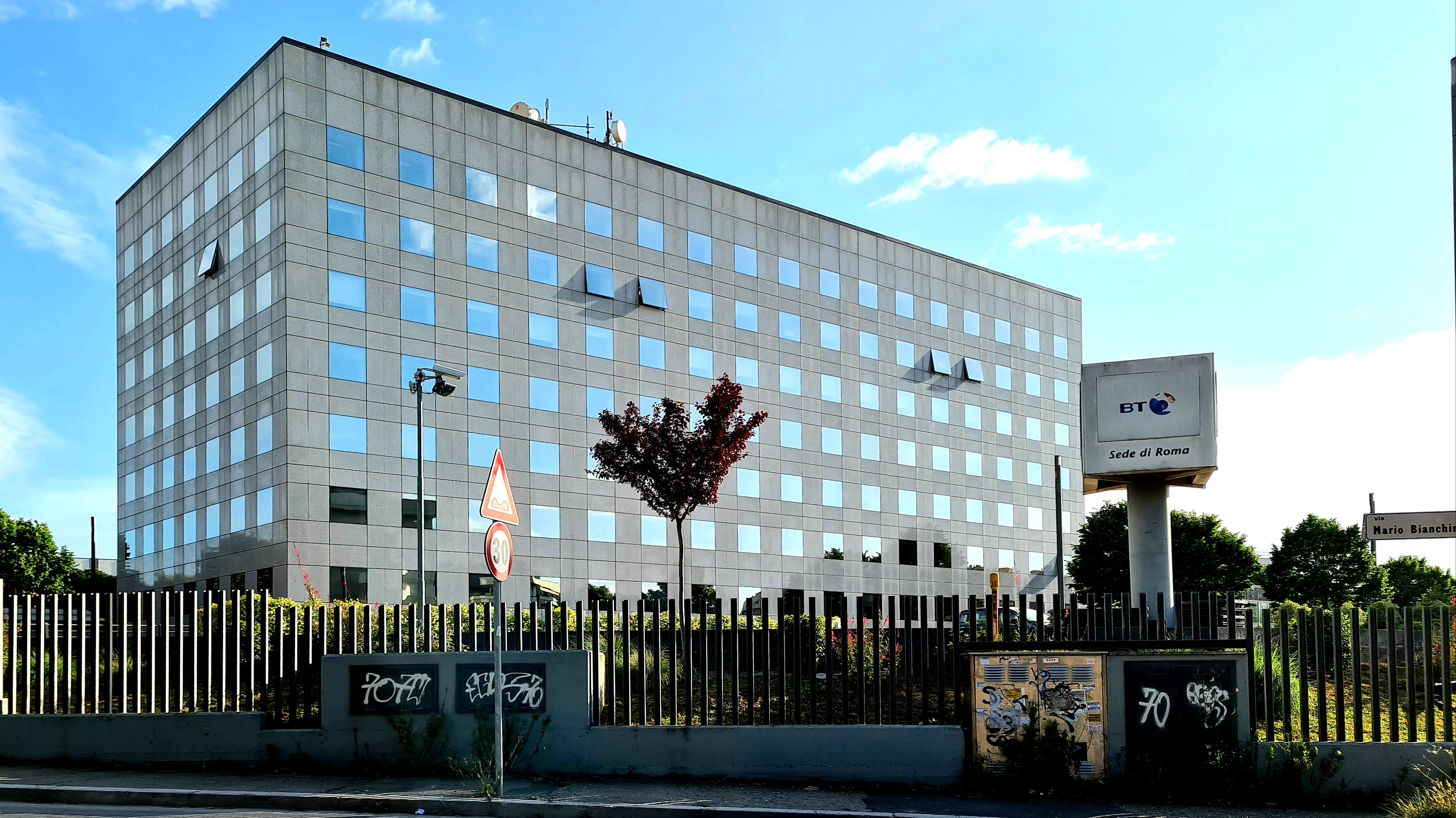
- BT Italia Rome headquarters
- Formerly: Albacom S.p.A. (1995-2005); BT Albacom S.p.A. (2005-2006)
- Type: Private, subsidiary
- Industry: Telecommunications
- Founded: September 1995; 31 years ago
- Headquarters: Milan, Italy
- Key people: Andrea Bono (CEO)
- Products: Telecommunications networks, Datacenters, IT Services, IT security
- Number of employees: 1200 (2017)
- Parent: Retelit
- Subsidiaries: BT Enìa, ERPTech
- Website: www.italia.bt.com

BT Italia S.p.A., currently owned by Retelit, is an Italian telecommunications company. With an 11% market share, it is the second largest business telecommunications operator in the Italian market.

== History ==
The company is the result of a series of industrial ventures and mergers that started with the founding of Albacom in 1995, then a joint venture of BT, BNL, ENI and Mediaset, each company controlling a 25% share. BT acted as the industrial partner, whereas the three other companies outsourced most or all of their telecommunication needs to Albacom, BNL significantly contributing its packet-switched network that served as the basis of Albacom's trunk.

The captive business kick-started Albacom's presence in the Italian TLC market, and enabled the company to aggressively start selling its services in the market at large.

In a separate deal, BT acquired in 2001 a controlling stake in the then-booming I.NET, founded in 1994 as an ISP and fast growing in the datacenter and IT services business with a strong emphasis on IT security. I.NET had been floated in 2000 on Milan Stock Exchange, and kept operating independently, and BT's influence on its policy was through the board of directors where however it did not hold any executive post.

Between 2002-2005, Albacom suffered from slowing growth and its financials turned into red; in the same time frame, the non-TLC partners negotiated with BT an exit from the venture which was finalized in 2005 with BT acquiring 100% of the capital and Albacom (that closely afterwards was renamed as BT Albacom) keeping long-term contracts with all three former shareholders.

In 2006, BT won a multi-year worldwide outsourcing contract with FIAT, that included the purchase of Atlanet, FIAT's TLC venture. Atlanet was then merged with Albacom to become BT Italia.

In 2007, BT made a public offer to purchase 100% of I.NET's capital, acknowledging a plan to merge the company into BT Italia and delisting the resulting company. Although some investors, that did not agree on delisting and had some doubts on the industrial plan, brought on litigation, the merger was completed on 11 January 2008 and I.NET was delisted the same day. At the same time, BT Italia acquired ERPTech S.p.A..

On 18 October 2019, BT launches the new logo and the new slogan "Beyond Limits".

On 1 October 2025, it was announced that the firm had been acquired by Retelit, an Italian ICT and telecommunications firm focused on the BSB market.

== Controversy ==
On 27 October 2016, it was reported that BT wrote down the value of its Italian operations by £145 million due to "inappropriate management behavior" at BT Italia. Upon further investigation, the total extent of the accounting scandal came to £530 million. In its aftermath, BT lost almost 21% of its market share – £8 billion – in a single day.
