= Smart number =

Synthetic unique identifier that communicates additional information

A smart number is any synthetic unique identifier that communicates additional information about the entity identified. The smart number is conceptually similar to a superkey as defined in the relational model of database organization, but is intended to inform end users about status of accounts. The term has fallen out of common usage since using one number to carry so much information is considered bad practice.

A smart number may encode information such as the entity's place of origin.

Common examples of smart numbers in use today include:

- Credit card numbers, which contain information about the credit issuing company.
- Auto insurance account numbers – vary by company but may contain information such as billing date, account status, and modification count.
- Dewey Decimal Classification

The term smart number may also apply to non-geographic telephone numbers, such as Australia's 13, 1300 and 1800 vanity numbers and freephone numbers. See Intelligent Network.
