= Openreach =

Infrastructure subsidiary of BT

Openreach Limited
- Type: Subsidiary
- Industry: Telecommunications
- Founded: 2006
- Headquarters: London, England, UK
- Area served: United Kingdom (except for Kingston upon Hull and neighboring areas)
- Key people: Mike McTighe (chairman); Katie Milligan (Chief Executive)
- Revenue: ▲£6.0 billion (2023/24)
- Operating income: ▲£3.8 billion (2023/24)
- Number of employees: 35,400 (2021)
- Parent: BT Group
- Website: openreach.com

Openreach Limited is a company wholly owned by BT Group that maintains the telephone cables, ducts, cabinets and exchanges that connect nearly all homes and businesses in the United Kingdom to various national broadband and telephone networks. It was established in 2006 following an agreement between BT and the UK's telecoms regulator Ofcom to implement certain undertakings, pursuant to the Enterprise Act 2002, to ensure that rival telecom operators have equality of access to BT's local network.

Openreach manages BT's local access network which connects customers to their local telephone exchange, starting at the main distribution frame (MDF) in the exchange and ending at the network termination point (NTP) at the end user's premises. Openreach also manages the connections between the MDF and the BT Wholesale/local-loop unbundling (LLU) termination points located in the exchange, often referred to as jumper connections.

In March 2017, after various negotiations with, and demands from, Ofcom, BT plc agreed to divest Openreach's staff and non-network assets into a legally separate company, Openreach Limited. The network assets would still be owned by BT plc to ensure the longevity of leases and covenants, and Openreach Limited would still be wholly owned by BT plc's parent holding company, BT Group plc, whilst Ofcom would monitor the company's strategic independence.

== History ==
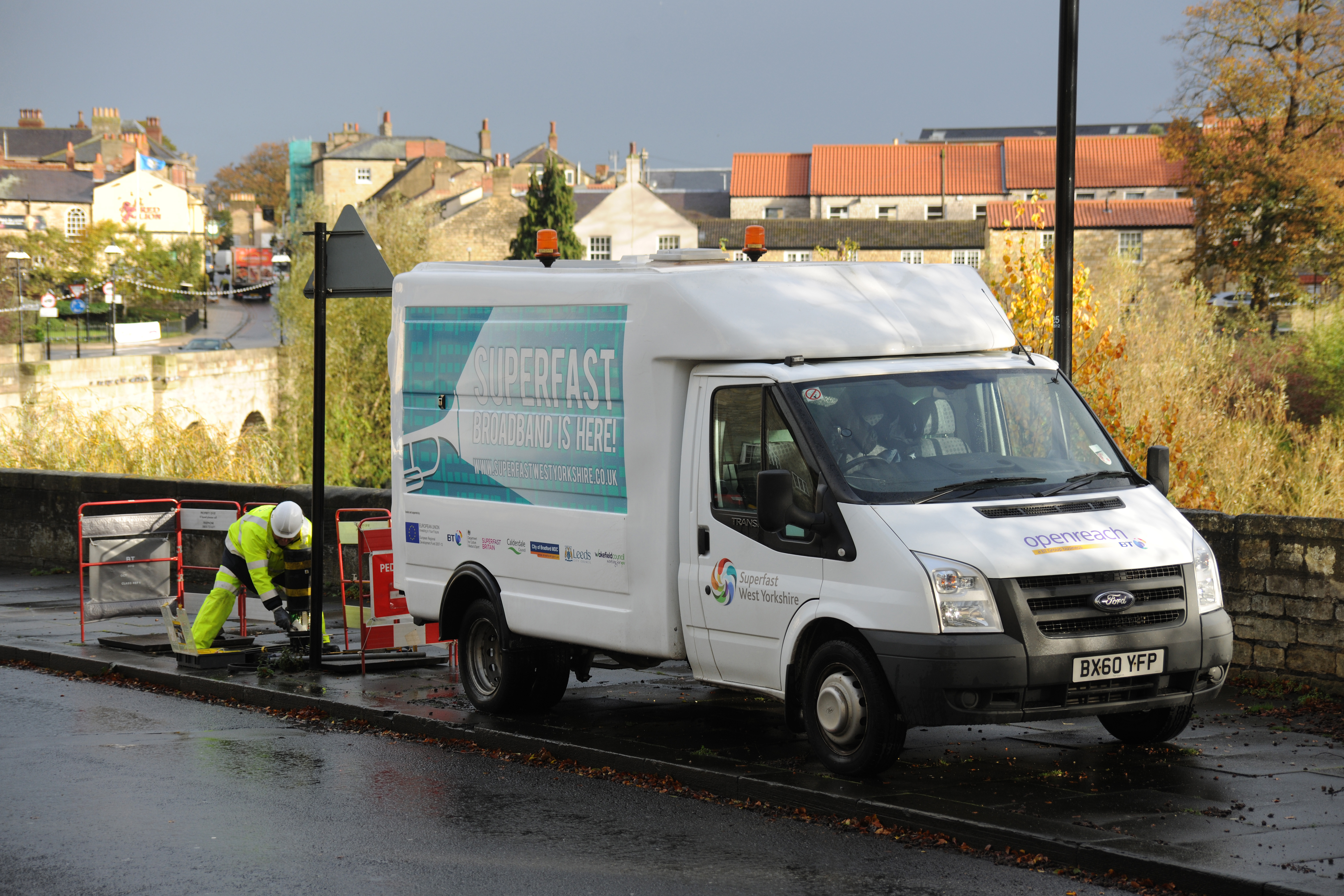
An Openreach engineer working on the "Superfast West Yorkshire" project in Wetherby (2014) at a manhole

Following the Telecommunications Strategic Review (TSR), in September 2005 British Telecom signed undertakings with Ofcom to create a separate division, for the purpose of providing equal access to BT's local access network and backhaul products. Ofcom previously argued that BT had significant market power in the British telecommunications market, specifically in residential voice services, business retail services, leased lines, wholesale international services, and wholesale broadband and fixed narrowband services. The resulting organisation, Openreach, opened for business in January 2006 and reported directly to the BT chief executive.

The functional separation of Openreach from BT has had mixed results, according to economists J. Gregory Sidak and Andrew Vassallo, who have argued that while Openreach's creation produced the short-run benefit of lower prices, it also led to long-run costs, such as declines in telecommunications investment, customer satisfaction, and measures of the United Kingdom's global competitiveness in telecommunications.

Today, the company is structured such that it is a wholly owned subsidiary of British Telecommunications plc (BT), which itself includes the four separately managed businesses and virtually all other assets of the BT Group.

In 2026, Openreach made a change to its executive team. Clive Selley, who had been the CEO since 2016, took over BT Group's new International division, with Katie Milligan succeeding him as Openreach's first female chief executive.

== Operations ==
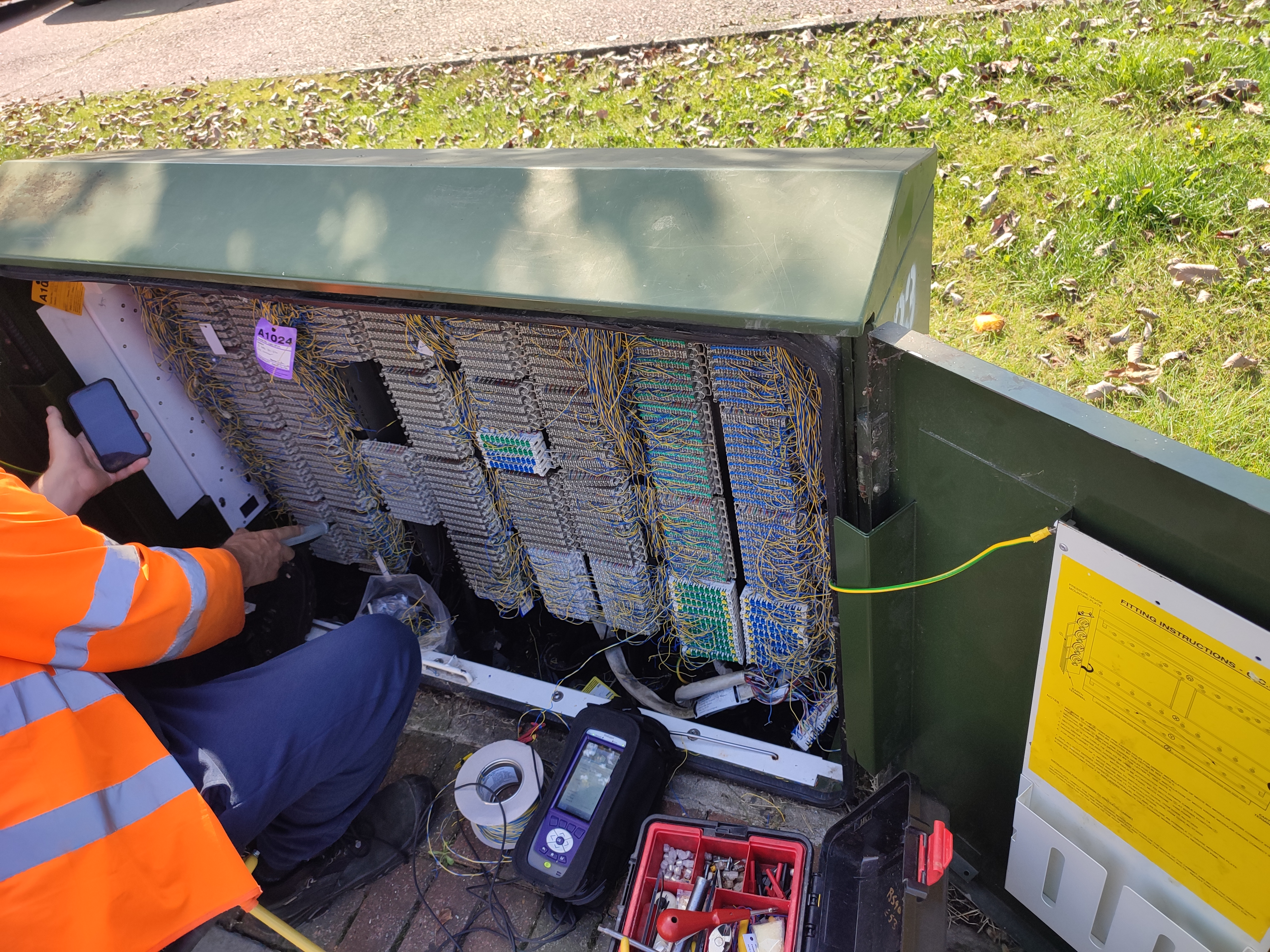
An engineer works at a VDSL cabinet

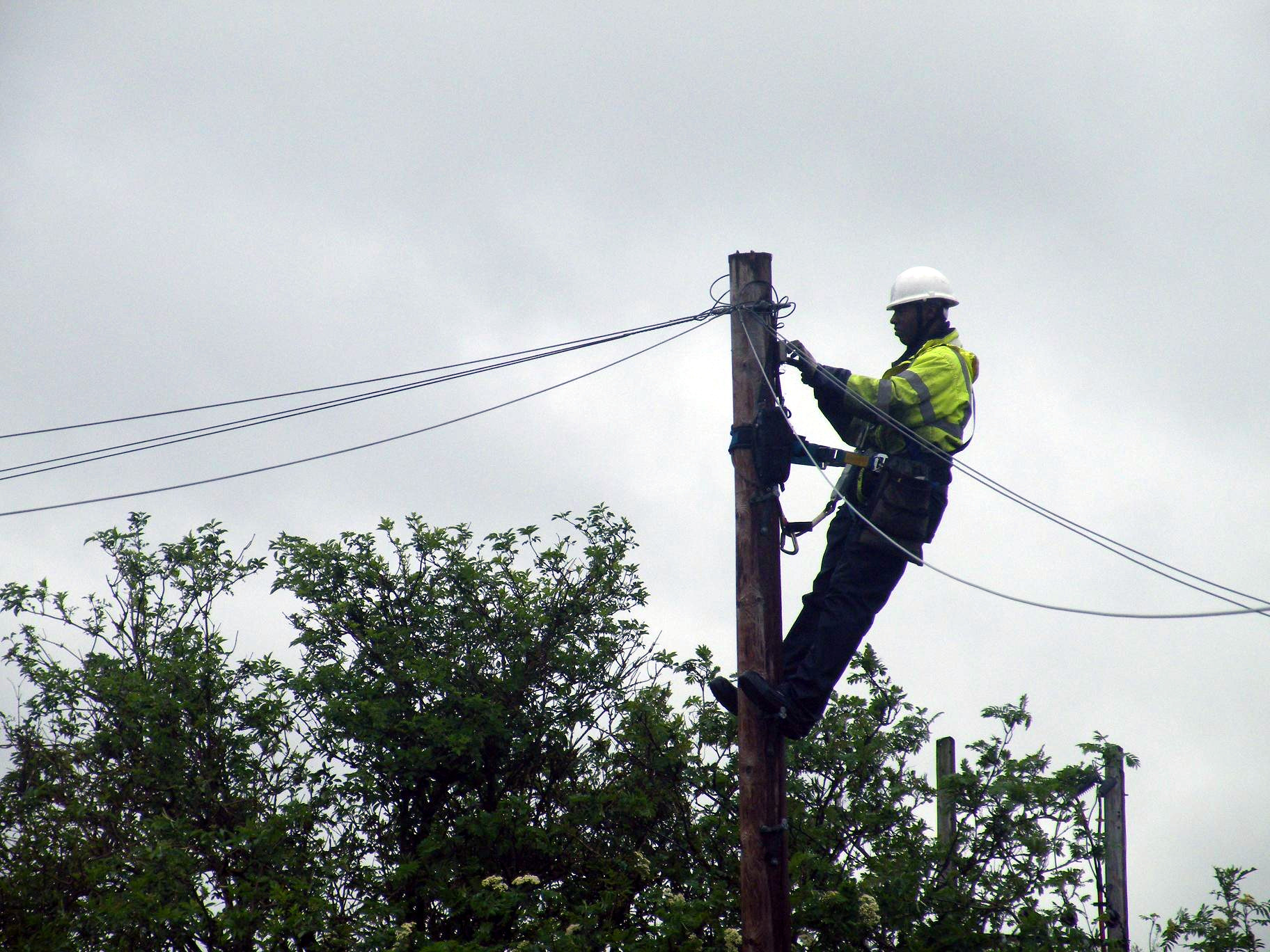
Man up a pole working at a block terminal

Field Telecommunications engineers install and maintain the physical network wiring from the telephone exchange into end customers' premises on behalf of 537 communication providers (CPs) which sell services directly to end customers.

Openreach engineers visit around 29,500 homes and offices every weekday on behalf of its customers, the CPs. They make 80,800 provision visits on copper, fibre and TV, and manage 90,000 repairs to its copper, fibre and broadband networks every week, remove around 40,000 unused cable connections from its exchanges and provide another 75,000 every day.

Every week they also deal with 650 network breakdowns due to damage, theft and weather, test 12,000 poles and replace 920, replace 85 cables and street cabinets, fix 100 low wires and connect another 3,000 newsite plots to its network.

== Fibre rollout ==
In 2009, BT announced that Openreach would connect 2.5 million British homes to the higher speed FTTP network service by 2012 and 25% of the UK. In July 2010, Openreach signed an £800 million contract with ECI Telecom to help it service and create a fibre-optic network serving 18 million households in the UK. The deal was the largest in ECI's history. However, by the end of September 2015, only 250,000 homes were connected. Instead, BT offered an "FTTP on Demand" product. In 2017, Openreach proposed offering super-fast fibre broadband to 10 million homes by 2025, using fibre to the premises (FTTP) technology.

In June 2017, Openreach demonstrated its version of G.fast technology, using "side pods" that can be bolted on to existing cabinets to offer potential UK broadband speeds of up to 100 Mbit/s. The technology is designed for distances of less than 500 metres (547 yards) between the cabinet and the property, and is cheaper to implement than FTTP because it does not involve laying fibre cables, although its maximum speed capacity is less than FTTP. Openreach proposed making G.fast-enabled broadband available to 12 million premises by 2020. By June 2018, G.fast technology had been made available to premises in 40 locations. Meanwhile, Openreach were connecting 8000 properties per week to FTTP with the aim of reaching 3 million premises by 2020, a target that was to increase following the publication of the Government's "Future Telecoms Infrastructure Review" and an increase in the supply of FTTP by alternative network ISPs. By May 2019, when it had connected 1.2 million premises to FTTP, Openreach aimed to have connected 4 million premises by 2021 and 15 million by around 2025.

As of March 2026, Openreach had connected 23 million premises to FTTP, with the aim to cross 25 million by December 2026.

== Criticism ==
Openreach has been criticised for its broadband speeds and for what its critics regard as the decreasing competitiveness of the UK's internet infrastructure. A study conducted in 2015 found that the UK had lower average speeds than Sweden, Norway, the Netherlands, Switzerland, Finland, Denmark, the Czech Republic and Belgium, but higher average speeds than Germany, France, Italy and Spain. More recent data from 2024 shows this has now improved, with Ofcom reporting that 1Gbit/s capable fixed gigabit broadband networks had now reached 84% of premises (up from 78% in 2023).

Openreach has received a high number of customer complaints relating to poor service, stemming from new home installation delays. Openreach does not communicate with members of the public, who are required to liaise with their service providers. BT have been accused of abusing their Openreach monopoly, particularly by underinvesting in the UK's broadband infrastructure, charging high prices and providing poor customer service.

In January 2016, a cross-party report by the British Infrastructure Group of MPs, working from data from the Office for National Statistics, found that around 5.7 million broadband customers in the UK had internet connections that did not reach Ofcom's acceptable minimum speed of 10 Mbit/s. Around 3.5 million of the customers affected lived in rural areas. The Digital Economy Act 2017 originally included a proposal for a legal right to a minimum download speed, but this was dropped. The government subsequently made a proposal for a universal service obligation (USO) granting remote households the right to request broadband speeds of at least 10 Mbit/s. This was countered by an offer made by BT for Openreach to provide the infrastructure for 99% of UK premises to receive download speeds of at least 10 Mbit/s by 2020, at a total cost of between £450 million and £600 million.

In March 2017, an investigation by Ofcom concluded that there were regulatory breaches at Openreach regarding the delivery of high-speed Ethernet cable services between January 2013 and December 2014. Contracts required compensation payments to be paid to other telecoms providers if the services were not delivered on time. However, Ofcom found that there had been a misuse of the terms of contracts, allowing the compensation payments to be reduced. BT was fined £42 million and agreed to pay the telecoms providers involved as much as £300 million in compensation.

== Independence from BT Group ==
In 2015, BT consulted on the possibility of allowing Openreach to deal directly with consumers, which would have required the approval of Ofcom, but withdrew the proposal, partly due to objections from other service providers. Openreach is accountable to each telecoms provider, as well as Ofcom. In July 2014, Ofcom completed a review of Openreach's service, resulting in mandated performance levels on key services.

In August 2015, Labour MP Chris Bryant called for Openreach to be split from BT, criticising the infrastructure and stating that it is too slow to fix faults and install new lines.

BT Group's acquisition of mobile phone operator EE, which received regulatory approval in October 2015, was partly funded using £1.7bn of Openreach's revenues. An investigation by the Competition and Markets Authority said it was not a competition issue but a matter for Ofcom, and Ofcom undertook its own enquiry. In December 2015, Ofcom indicated it was examining four options for Openreach's future: maintaining the current arrangement, more deregulation, structural separation from BT, or adjusting the current system. Keeping the status quo was said to be unlikely. The initial conclusions of Ofcom's investigation, which were published in February 2016, did not require BT to sell Openreach.

In January 2016, a report backed by 121 cross-party MPs stated Ofcom should force BT to sell off its Openreach division to open up competition. Nevertheless, Ofcom's final decision, published in July 2016, did not require BT to sell Openreach, primarily due to the time required and costs involved in addressing pension, lease and covenant issues. On 29 November 2016, Ofcom ordered BT to legally separate its Openreach division, with Openreach becoming a distinct company within the BT group. Ofcom further announced that it was preparing a formal notification to the European Commission to start the separation process.

In March 2017, BT Group plc agreed to make Openreach a separate company, Openreach Limited, with its own staff and management, but with the network assets continuing to be owned by BT plc for land-contract reasons, and with Openreach Limited being wholly owned by BT Group plc, BT plc's parent holding company. In July 2017, Openreach began removing the BT element from its logo and, in September 2017, Openreach removed BT branding from its website.

On 14 June 2018, Ofcom published a report titled "Progress on delivering a more independent Openreach" which found that "there has been broadly satisfactory progress towards legal separation, but some steps have still not been completed". On 31 July 2020, Openreach released a news article on their website showing their progress on their split from BT, with them updating "27,907 vehicles, 42 offices, 33,479 pass cards and 1,531 web pages" to reflect the change. Openreach has been awarded the status of 'Superbrand' for 2020/21.

Ofcom monitors Openreach's strategic independence from BT via their Openreach Monitoring Unit. In their September 2024 report, Openreach was praised for the rapid rise in full fibre availability for "people across the UK" and found nothing in the last reporting cycle that would justify opening any further investigations.

== National security threats and personal privacy ==
The Chinese telecommunications company Huawei was contracted to supply critical components to UK telecoms networks, including Openreach's fibre infrastructure in 2010 and EE's 4G network. Between 2010 and 2012, the UK intelligence community initiated an investigation aimed at Huawei, with increasing urgency after the US, Canada, and Australia prevented the company from operating in their countries. Although BT had notified the UK government in 2003 of Huawei's interest in their £10 billion network upgrade contract, what they did not do was raise the security implications as BT failed to explain that the Chinese company would have unfettered access to critical infrastructure. On 16 December 2012, David Cameron was supplied with a in-depth report indicating that the intelligence services had very grave doubts regarding Huawei, in that the UK governmental, military, business community and private citizen's privacy may be under serious threat. Subsequently, BT's Infinity programme and other projects underwent urgent review.

On 7 June 2013, a report of the Intelligence and Security Committee of Parliament concluded that BT should never have allowed the Chinese company access to the UK's critical communications network without ministerial oversight, saying they were "deeply shocked" that BT did not inform government that they were allowing Huawei and ZTE, which both have ties to the Chinese military, unfettered access to critical national systems. Furthermore, ministers discovered that the agency with responsibility to ensure Chinese equipment and code was threat-free was entirely staffed by Huawei employees. Subsequently, the committee confirmed that in case of an attack on the UK, there was nothing at this point that could be done to stop Chinese infiltration attacking critical national infrastructure. In 2014, the Huawei Cyber Security Evaluation Board was set up to test and monitor Huawei's products on an ongoing basis in an attempt to address the security concerns. Huawei is not permitted to supply the telecoms market in the US and a number of other countries because of concerns that its products include "backdoors" which could allow Chinese security services access to the equipment.

ZTE, another Chinese company supplying extensive network equipment and subscriber hardware to BT Infinity, also came under scrutiny after the US, Canada, Australia, and the European Union declared the company a security risk to its citizens. In 2018, the UK's National Cyber Security Centre (NCSC) and US authorities took action separately to restrict the operations of ZTE over security concerns, with the NCSC warning UK telecoms companies not to use ZTE devices.
