= Bas Burger =

Dutch business executive

- Born: 1970 (age 55–56); Netherlands
- Education: Hogeschool Utrecht, University of Bradford
- Occupation: Business executive
- Years active: 1990s–present
- Board member of: Committee for Economic Development

Bas Burger (born 1970) is a Dutch business executive known for his work in the international telecom industry. Currently CEO, Business, BT, he is a contributor to the World Economic Forum and is on the Committee for Economic Development.

After starting his career with the telecom companies Fifth Generation Systems, PTT Telecom, and KPN in the early 1990s, in 2002 he was appointed CEO of KPN Entercom Solutions BV. In 2006 Burger was appointed executive vice president of Getronics NV, a Dutch IT company.

In 2008, Burger was appointed CEO of BT in the Benelux, which gave him oversight for BT business in Belgium, the Netherlands and Luxembourg. He was appointed president of global commerce in 2011, and in 2013, he was appointed president of BT in the Americas, a role he held until 2017.

== Early life and education ==
Bas Burger was born in 1970 in the Netherlands. From 1989 until 1993 Burger attended Hogeschool Utrecht in the Netherlands, graduating with a BBA. He subsequently attended the University of Bradford in the United Kingdom from 1993 until 1995, where he earned his master of business administration.

== Career ==
In the early 1990s Burger served as a sales manager at the computer security company Fifth Generation Systems in the United Kingdom, also serving as the company's marketing manager for Europe. He began working with the telecom company PTT Telecom in 1994. PTT then became KPN, where Burger held various sales and senior management positions. In 2002 he was appointed CEO of KPN Entercom Solutions BV, also serving as a managing director. In 2006 Burger was appointed executive vice president of Getronics NV, a Dutch IT company. Until 2008, he was also a member of Getronics' management committee. His responsibilities as executive vice president included channel and partner management, global sales, and support and development of international business.

In May 2008, Burger was appointed CEO of BT in the Benelux. A unit of the Global Services division of BT, BT Benelux oversees business in Belgium, the Netherlands and Luxembourg and focuses on providing network-based ICT services to business customers. Burger started the position on June 1, 2008, replacing Michel De Coster.

By January 2011, he was overseeing 1900 people with a responsibility for "a turnover of approximately 700 million euros" annually.

BT appointed him their president of global commerce, Global Services, in 2011, adding the Global Consumer Packaged Goods (CPG) and the Global Pharmaceutical and Chemical industry sectors in 2013. Bas also led BT's operations across Europe, the Middle-East, Africa and Latin America in 2012–2013.

In 2013, he was appointed president of BT in the Americas, focusing on multinational customers in North America, including TD Bank and Unilever. Burger assumed oversight of the around 2,600 staff in the United States. Burger remained president of the BT Americas unit until 2017.

He became CEO of Global Services, on 1 June 2017.

In 2023, BT merged its two B2B units, Enterprise and Global, to form Business. Burger became CEO of the newly formed unit on 1 January 2023.

As of 2017, Burger is a member of the Committee for Economic Development.

== Media presence ==
Burger has made periodic appearances in the media, often to speak on telecom-related topics or to represent BT. In 2013 he was interviewed on PBS about cloud computing and his work with BTl . He has also been interviewed on NASDAQ video on topics such as Google's dark fiber projects, and in 2014 he met with government officials in Washington, D.C. to "ask for regulation of special access including Metro Ethernet... to end the negative effects of the effective monopoly held by AT&T and Verizon in the U.S." Burger contended in interviews around that time that both AT&T and Verizon were "manipulating pricing to discourage the move to Ethernet for most companies," for example appearing on Fox News. In 2015, Burger stated to the Financial Times that BT was being overcharged by Verizon and AT&T for access to their networks, arguing that American monopoly laws were insufficient to guarantee fair market competition among telecom and landline companies.

== Personal life ==
Burger and his family moved from Southlake, Texas to the UK in 2017.
