= Dabs.com =

Former British e-commerce retailer

dabs.com
- Type: Subsidiary
- Industry: Retail
- Founded: 1987; 39 years ago (offline as Dabs Press); 1990; 36 years ago (offline as Dabs Direct and eventually online as Dabs.com)
- Headquarters: Bolton, England
- Area served: United Kingdom; Republic of Ireland
- Key people: Helen Slinger (CEO)
- Revenue: ▲£200m (2008)
- Number of employees: 200
- Parent: BT Group

dabs.com was an e-commerce retailer in the United Kingdom which was one of the country's largest online retailers of IT and technology products. From 2006 until its closure in 2016, it was a subsidiary of BT Group.

== History ==
Originally Dabs Press, from 1987 to 1990, then Dabs Direct, the company primarily sold its products via advertisements in IT-related magazines. dabs.com was founded in Bolton by David Atherton and Bruce Smith in 1987; Dabs is an acronym of the initials of the founders' names. It subsequently grew to employ more than 200 people, with annual revenue of £200m from 5,000 transactions daily.

Dabs.com was a shirt sponsor of Fulham F.C. for the 2003–04 and 2004–05 seasons.

=== BT takeover ===
In April 2006 it was announced that BT Group had purchased dabs.com for an estimated £30m and that the business would become a wholly owned subsidiary of BT. The company's operations in France were subsequently closed at the end of May 2006.

=== Closure ===
In April 2016, the dabs.com brand was retired and replaced by BT Shop for consumers and BT Business Direct for business customers. This included the closure of the dabs.ie website for the Republic of Ireland and the end of consumer-oriented sales there on the same date.
