= Trading turret =

Telephone

A trading turret or dealer board is a specialized telephony key system that is generally used by financial traders on their trading desks. Trading has progressed from floor trading through phone trading to electronic trading during the later half of the twentieth century with phone trading having dominated during the 1980s and 1990s. Although most trading volume is now done via electronic trading platforms, some phone trading persists and trading turrets are common on trading desks of investment banks.

== Voice trading turrets ==
Trading turrets, unlike typical phone systems, have a number of features, functions and capabilities specifically designed for the needs of financial traders. Trading turrets enable users to visualize and prioritize incoming call activity from customers or counter-parties and make calls to these same people instantaneously by pushing a single button to access dedicated point-to-point telephone lines (commonly called Ringdown circuits). In addition, many traders have dozens or hundreds of dedicated speed dial buttons and large distribution hoot-n-holler or Squawk box circuits which allow immediate mass dissemination or exchange of information to other traders within their organization or to customers and counter-parties. Due to these requirements many Turrets have multiple handsets and multi-channel speaker units, generally these are shared by teams (for example: equities, fixed income, foreign exchange) or in some cases globally across whole trading organizations. Unlike standard Private Branch Exchange telephone systems (PBX) designed for general office users, Trading turret system architecture has historically relied on highly distributed switching architectures that enable parallel processing of calls and ensure a "non-blocking, non-contended" state where there is always a greater number of trunks (paths in/out of the system) than users as well as fault tolerance which ensures that any one component failure can not affect all users or lines. As processing power has increased and switching technologies have matured, voice trading systems are evolving from digital time-division multiplexing (TDM) system architectures to Internet Protocol (IP) server-based architectures. IP technologies have transformed communications for traders by enabling converged, multimedia communications that include, in addition to traditional voice calls, presence-based communications such as: unified communications and messaging, instant messaging (IM), chat and audio/video conferencing. Some modern trading turret models are optimized to integrate with PBX platform. By natively registering on CUCM, for example, office users and turret users can have tighter collaboration and reduce total cost of ownership.

While some trading turret systems also include intercom functions, it is common that financial services firms use an independent intercom system along with trading turret systems.

== See also ==
- Electronic trading platform
- Dedicated line
- Stock market data systems
- Straight-through processing (STP)
- Trading system
- Trading room
