= 81 Newgate Street =

Office building in the City of London

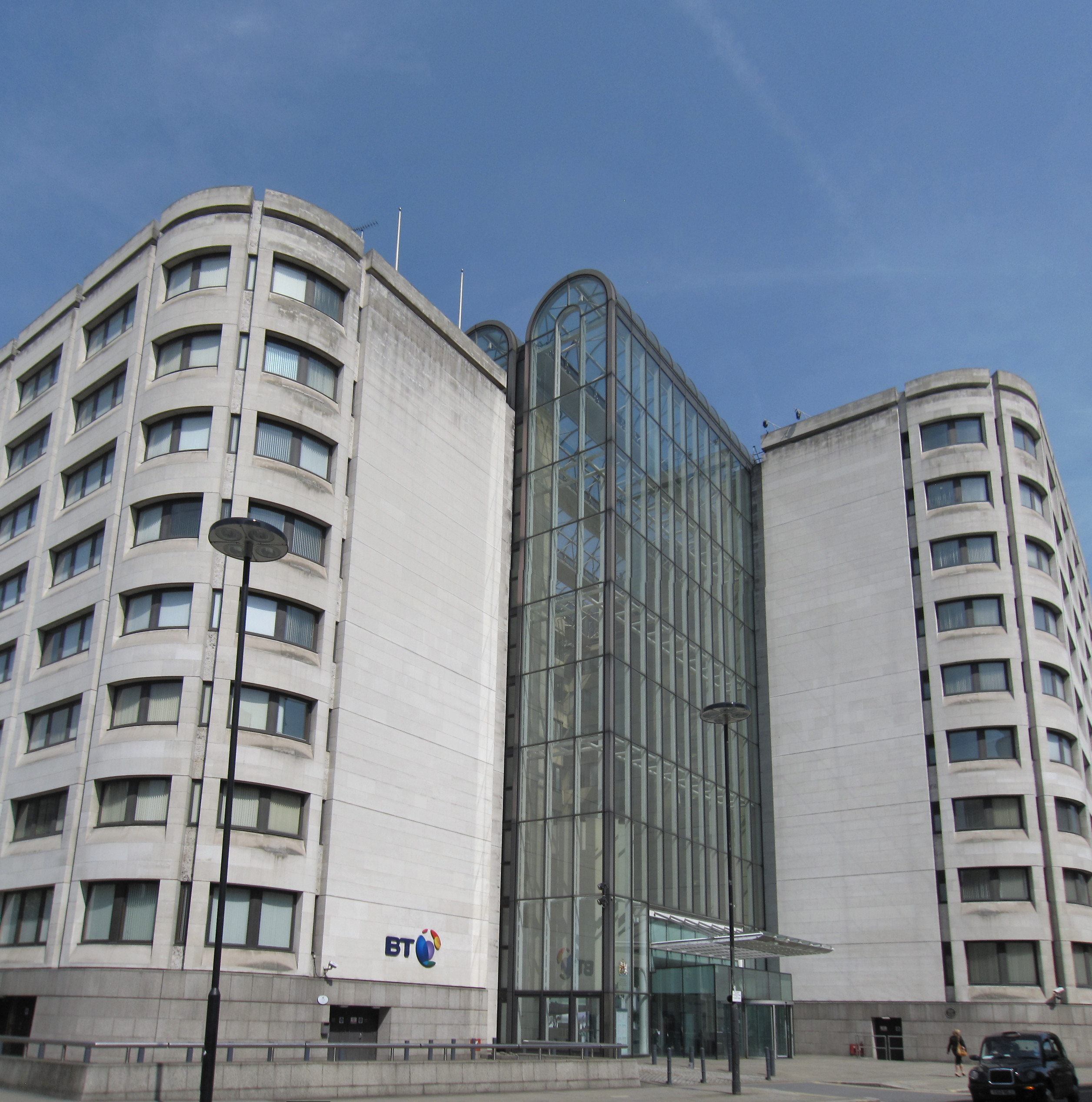
- Former names: BT Centre
- Alternative names: Panorama St Paul’s

General information
- Location: London, England, UK
- Coordinates: 51.5156°N 0.0978°W
- Opened: 1985
- Renovated: 2022–present

Design and construction
- Known for: Being the global headquarters and registered office of former tenant, BT Group.

81 Newgate Street (alternatively referred to as Panorama St Paul’s) is a 10-storey office building on Newgate Street in the City of London, opposite St Paul's tube station. It opened in its current state in June 1984.

Prior to the departure of the BT Group in December 2021, it was best known as the BT Centre, having been the global headquarters and registered office of the group since its opening in its current state in 1984. It had been home to BT and its predecessors, including the General Post Office, for more than a century.

HSBC, currently based at 8 Canada Square, will move into the building in early 2027, following the completion of redevelopment work being undertaken by Kohn Pedersen Fox.

== History ==
The building was designed for British Telecom by the Property Services Agency in a 'modern and forward-looking' style (though its Portland stone and granite facings recalled the Central Telegraph Office, which had previously stood on the site). The main entrance, on Newgate Street, was built on the alignment of Bath Street, which had been closed since 1934 and was completely covered by the new building. In 1997-99 the interior of the building was substantially updated, 'to make better use of space, conform to modern approaches to working, and exploit the latest telecommunications technology for more effective and fulfilling working'.

== Sale and rebuilding ==
In 2019, BT sold the building and revealed plans to relocate their offices to 1 Braham Street near Aldgate East tube station. Their new headquarters was opened in November 2021 (in the intervening time they had continued to occupy the BT Centre in a leaseback deal). As of 2023, the 81 Newgate Street was being very substantially altered in what was described as a 'retrofit and expansion' of the property: the building's structural frame is being retained but it is otherwise being entirely rebuilt to create flexible office space, retail units and a roof garden with a restaurant. 'Its massing will change considerably, with a portion of the front removed to reduce its impact on key views and new bays added stepping down from north to south creating accessible terraces'.

== History of the site ==
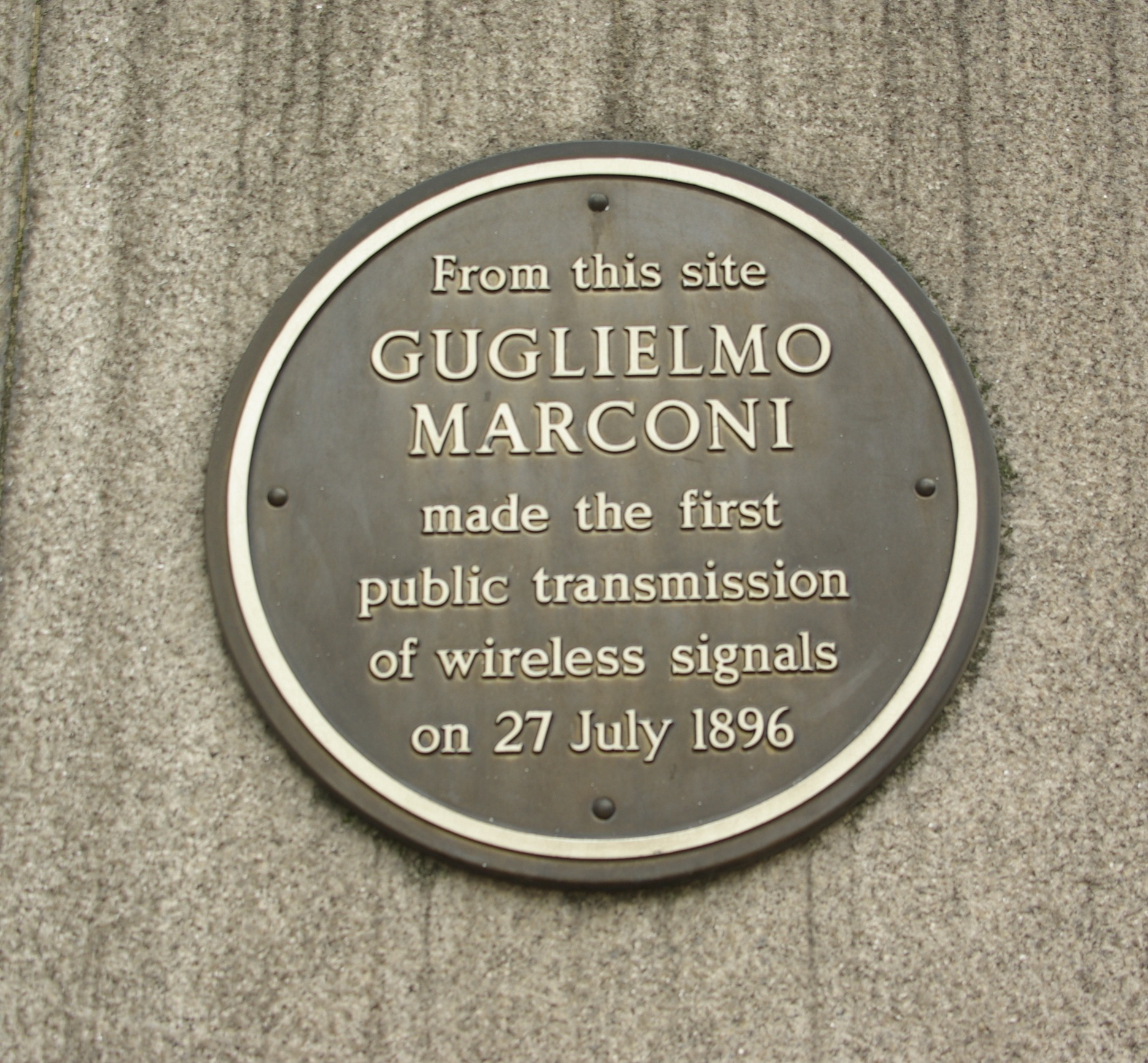
Commemorative plaque on the building.

A plaque on the outside of the building marks this as the location from which Guglielmo Marconi made the first public transmission of wireless signals, in 1897 while it was the Central Telegraph Office building of the General Post Office complex. The Telegraph Office building was originally built in 1874. It was damaged by a German bomb in 1917, and more severely damaged by bombing in 1940 when the interior was burned out; it reopened in 1943. By the 1950s, the volume of telegraph traffic had declined; the Telegraph Office closed in 1963, Subsequently, the building was declared unsafe and was demolished in 1967. Following archaeological investigations by the Museum of London, planning permission was granted for the new building in 1979.
