= BT site engineering code =

Physical location code used by BT and previously the GPO

A BT site engineering code is a group of letters assigned by BT, or its predecessor the General Post Office, to a physical location which is equipped by the company with unusual amounts or types of telecommunications.

Such codes relate to both BT's own buildings and major customer sites.

Historically, site codes beginning with the letter Q were government or defence sites. Codes beginning with the letter Y were radio-related sites. The latter category broadened somewhat over time to include many other kinds of customer site.

== Site engineering codes in alphabetical order ==
=== Q ===
- QAAA Newmarket
- QAAR Acklington
- QACY Preston
- QACF Huntingdon
- QACX Preston
- QADB Bracknell
- QADF Staxton Wold
- QADN Cranwell
- QADH Watnall
- QAEH Stafford
- QAEL Kinloss
- QALD Aldergrove
- QAPA Leconfield
- QBAF Chippenham
- QBEN RAF Benson [Queen's Flight]
- QBFM Forest Moor
- QBIN Binbrook
- QBTY Bawtry (HQ 1Gp)
- QBUS Cambuslans
- QCAT Catterick
- QCBL Shrewsbury
- QCEA Carlisle
- QCEN Leighton Buzzard (Q-Central)
- QCHL Coltishall
- QCON Coningsby
- QCOS Cosford
- QCWL Chilwell
- QDIS Dishforth
- QDH Dollis Hill (GPO Research Station)
- QFIN Finningley
- QHKN Bathgate
- QJOA Towsbury House
- QHEM Helmswell
- QIVM Fylingdales
- QLDM Lindholm & Northern Radar
- QLIN Linton
- QLMG Leeming
- QMBY Manby
- QMET Kelvedon Hatch bunker (originally RAF Fighter Command 'Metropolitan Sector')
- QMHA North Luffenham
- QMID Midd Street Geodinsdle
- QNCC Lindholme (840SU)
- QNCT North Coates
- QNLO Preston
- QNRN Shipton
- QNTH Northwood
- QNWC RAF North West Signals Centre
- QOUS Ouston
- QPLY Plymouth
- QPTE Pitreavie
- QQAT Aldershot
- QQCA Preston
- QQCC Corsham
- QQFS Neatishead [R3]
- QQGF Chipenham
- QQGM Inverbervie
- QQGR Boulmer
- QQGU Anstruther
- QQJD Hack Green
- QQNB Craigie Hall
- QQRE York
- QRAA Boddington
- QSCD South Down
- QSCM Scampton
- QSTA Stanmore
- QSYE Syerston
- QTOP Topcliffe
- QTUR Barnton Quarry
- QUTA York Mil
- QUXB Uxbridge
- QVCA Glen Parva
- QWAC Harrogate
- QWAD Waddington
- QWAH RAF High Wycombe
- QWHI Whitehall

=== Y ===
- YABR Albrighton
- YACW Arncliffe Wood
- YBAI Bagshot (Surrey Hill)
- YBCA Benbecula
- YBCL Blackcastle Hill
- YBFL Blackford Hill
- YBFM Charwelton
- YBGT Burngate
- YBMR BT Tower (Birmingham)
- YBNM Burnham
- YBNP Blaen Plwyf
- YBRA Barra
- YBRX Bruxie Hill
- YBTH Butser Hill
- YBUD Bury Down
- YBUR Burnhope
- YBYB Ballymena
- YCAG Caister
- YCAM Cambret Hill
- YCAW Mount Stamper
- YCBC Corby's Crag
- YCBY Claxby
- YCHI Chillerton Down
- YCLC Cullercoats New Radio Station
- YCMB Cambelt Hill
- YCOK Copt Oak
- YCOR Core Hill
- YCOZ Connel
- YCRA Craiglockhart Hill
- YCRG Craigowl Hill
- YCRR Corstorphine Hill Radio Stn. R. Site Bot.
- YCRT Corstorphine Hill Radio Stn. T. Site Bot.
- YCSM Five Ways
- YCSP Carlton Scroop
- YCSR Kelsall NATS station
- YCVW Cave Wold
- YDAC Dalton-in-Furness
- YDMH Deadmans Hill
- YDOG Douglas Radio Stn. Transmit Hut
- YDOR Dorchester
- YEAH East Harptree
- YECR Elstree Apparatus Room (BBC)
- YELM East Lomond Radio Station
- YFAS Fairseat
- YFAY Farley
- YFLW Flimwell
- YFOR Forder Battery
- YHFP Holborn Flexibility Point (deep level)
- YHOG TV-am Camden Town (Henlys Old Garage)
- YGFW Greenford
- YGHD Great Hatfield
- YGKP Greenock
- YGLB Gallanach Beg.
- YGOO Goosemoor
- YGOY Goonhilly
- YGPT Golden Pot
- YGRH Granite Hill
- YGRL Green Lowther
- YHAL Halwell
- YHAV Haverfordwest
- YHEA Heaton Park
- YHEY Heysham
- YHIL Hillingdon
- YHLY Hornsea
- YHMG Horwich
- YHTS Hunters Stones
- YHWD Harrow Weald
- YHZZM Dial House Manchester
- YINS Inskip
- YKEL Kelvedon Hatch
- YKIL Kilchiaran
- YKMV Kirtomy
- YKSH Kirk o'Shotts
- YKSH/WT Kirk O'Shotts BT
- YKUW Kirkby Underwood
- YLFM Lonely Farm
- YLGS BBC Lime Grove
- YLLG Llanllawddog
- YLST Lochinver R/S/Radio Stn.
- YLTH Lowther Hill
- YMAA Maaruig
- YMAG Mallaig
- YMLG Melvaig
- YMNM Mendlesham
- YMOR Morborne Hill
- YMUG Muggleswick
- YNRB Neatishead [R30]
- YOKM Oakham
- YOVR Over
- YPCG Pencarreg
- YPGN Pye Green
- YPLC Pimlico
- YPPK Portpatrick Coastal Radio Station
- YPRE Preseli
- YPRH Proctor Heights
- YPTP Pontop Pike
- YPUR Purdown
- YQNR Quernmore
- YRID Riddings Hill
- YRIN Manchester (Ringway) Airport
- YRIV Rivington Pike (Winter Hill Broadcast TX)
- YRSM Rosemarkie
- YRXR Rothesay SHF Radio Stn.
- YSBR St Albans
- YSBY Sibleys
- YSCN Sutton Common
- YSHC Stoke Holy Cross
- YSHF Madley Satellite Earth Station (Street House Farm)
- YSHR Shanes Hill
- YSOM Somerton
- YSPF Sparsholt Firs
- YSRF Sheriff's Mountain R.V. Stn.
- YSRS Skriaig
- YSTK Stokenchurch
- YSTL Stillingfleet
- YSTS Standing Stones
- YSWH Swaffham
- YTAC Tacolneston
- YTHH Thornhill
- YTHL Turners Hill
- YTHM Tobermory SHF Radio Stn
- YTIL Tinshill
- YTIR Tirnascobe
- YTNL Thornton-in-Lonsdale
- YTOR Tor Sliasg
- YTOW BT Tower, London
- YTSD Tatsfield
- YTTH Two Top Hill
- YTVC BBC Television Centre
- YTYC Twycross
- YULL Ullapool
- YUPF Upton
- YWBH Wisbech
- YWCK Wickhambrook
- YWEN Wenallt
- YWFR Werfa
- YWHC Whinfell Common
- YWHK Whitehawk Hill
- YWHN Whitestone
- YWIL Windy Hill
- YWNY Wooler
- YWPE Wotton-under-Edge
- YYGU Guernsey State Radio Stn.
- YZAR BBC Broadcasting House London
- YZSK Skelton

=== Z ===
- ZAK Humber Radio Stn.
- ZAM Anglesey Radio Stn.
- ZBA Bearley Radio Stn.
- ZBD Brentwood Radio Stn.
- ZBY Braewynner Radio Stn.
- ZHO Hopealone Radio Stn.
- ZIF Ilfracombe Radio Stn.
