= BT Tower (disambiguation) =

BT Tower may refer to a number of telecommunications towers and buildings in Britain, from their connection to British Telecommunications.

== Telecommunications towers ==
- See Telecommunications towers in the United Kingdom

== Buildings ==
- BT Tower, Birmingham
- BT Tower, Cardiff (next to the Millennium Stadium)
- BT Tower, London
- BT Tower, Manchester
- BT Tower, Swansea
- BT Tower (also known as British Telecom Building and Westside Tower), 1 Market Street, Sydney now known as 1 Market Street.
- Purdown BT Tower, Bristol
- Pye Green BT Tower, Staffordshire
