= Stokenchurch BT Tower =

Telecommunications tower in Buckinghamshire, England

Stokenchurch
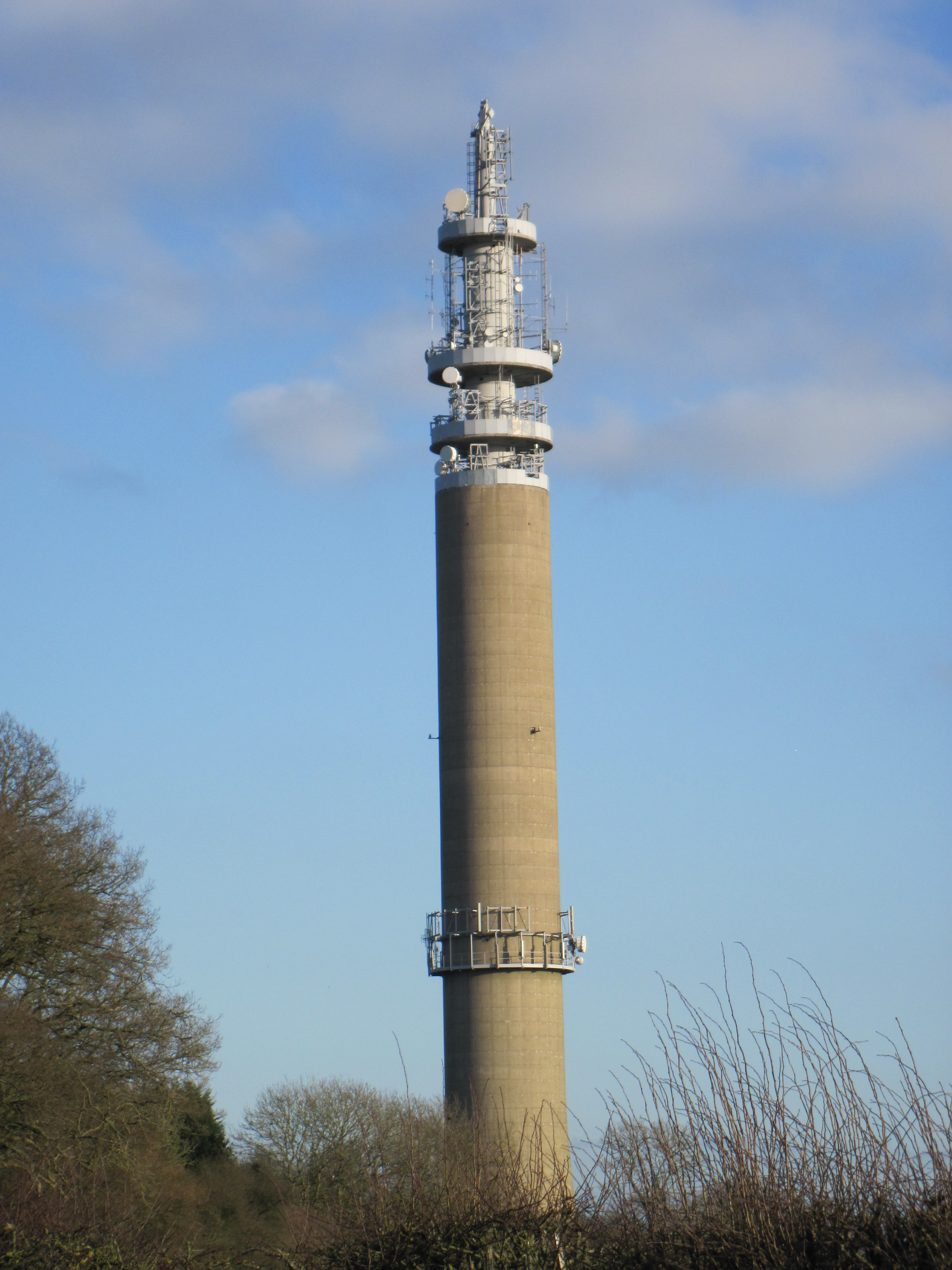
- Stokenchurch BT Tower

- Location within Buckinghamshire
- Location: Stokenchurch, Buckinghamshire
- Tower height: 99.4 metres (326 ft)
- Coordinates: 51.665375°N 0.923828°W
- Grid reference: SU7442196888
- Built: 1963

Stokenchurch BT Tower is a telecommunications tower built of reinforced concrete at Stokenchurch, Buckinghamshire, England. Reaching to 340.5 metres (1,117 ft) above mean sea level, it dates from 1963 and is 99.4 metres (326 ft) tall. There are four platforms at the top that are used to attach microwave transmission drums and other antennas. The tower is visible on clear days from The Shard in central London, at a distance of 60km.

The Stokenchurch Tower is one of the fourteen BT towers built of reinforced concrete. Seven of the fourteen are of similar design, known as the 'Chilterns' type, after this tower's location on the Chiltern Hills. They are identical except for their heights, which vary considerably; the Stokenchurch BT Tower is the second tallest out of the set. The towers are located at:-

Tower	Location	Coordinates	Height	Year of built
Stokenchurch BT Tower	Stokenchurch, Buckinghamshire	51.665388°N 0.923827°W	99.4 m ( 326 ft)	
Charwelton BT Tower	Charwelton, Northamptonshire	52.202327°N 1.251020°W	118 m ( 387 ft)	
Pye Green BT Tower	Pye Green, Staffordshire	52.728687°N 2.019589°W	96.9 m ( 318 ft)	
Wotton-under-Edge BT Tower	Wotton-under-Edge, Gloucestershire	51.649319°N 2.304024°W	76.2 m ( 250 ft)	
Heaton Park BT Tower	Manchester	53.539611°N 2.255223°W	72.54 m ( 238 ft)	
Sutton Common BT Tower	Macclesfield, Cheshire	53.206135°N 2.100711°W	72 m ( 238 ft)	
Tinshill BT Tower	Cookridge area, Leeds, West Yorkshire	53.854752°N 1.612009°W	60.96 m ( 200 ft)	

== See also ==
- British Telecom microwave network
- Telecommunications towers in the United Kingdom
