= Telecommunications towers in the United Kingdom =

British Telecommunications towers

Telecommunications towers in the United Kingdom are operated mainly by Arqiva. Arqiva operates the transmitters for UK terrestrial TV and most radio broadcasting, both analogue and digital. BT also operates a number of telecommunications towers in the UK.

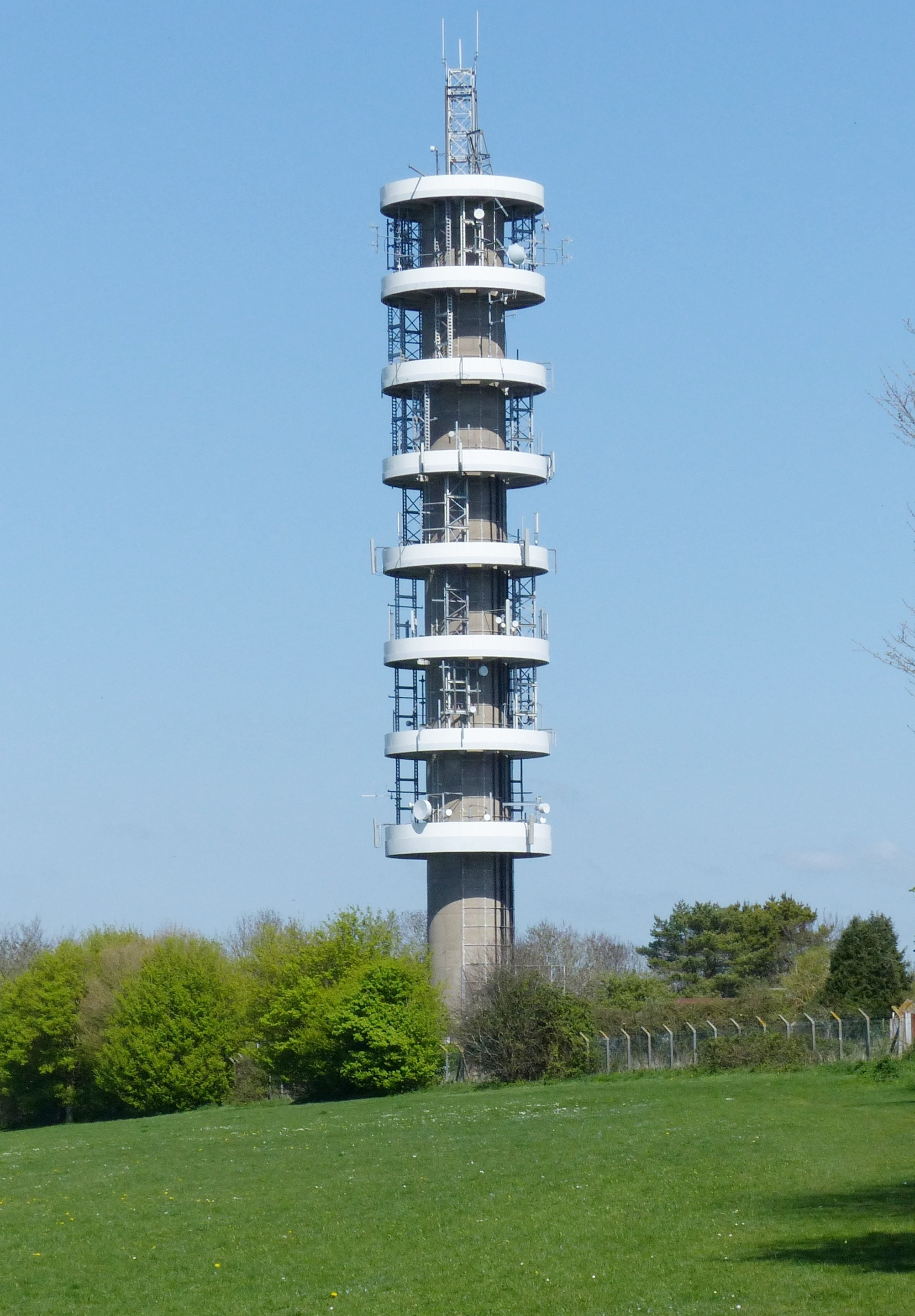
Purdown BT Tower, Bristol

== BT ==
BT's towers were, at one time, the backbone for a national line-of-sight microwave telecommunications network. One of the most famous of these is the BT Tower in London. However, the introduction of fibre optic network technology rendered these microwave towers largely obsolete for their original purpose. Nowadays they tend to be used mainly for relatively low capacity fixed links to customer sites and mobile telephony.

=== List of BT towers ===
BT Group owns at least 200 radio masts and towers in Britain. Of these, fourteen are reinforced concrete towers. The rest are of steel lattice construction.

Seven of the fourteen are of similar design, known as the 'Chilterns' type, after the first one which was built at Stokenchurch on the Chiltern Hills. They are identical except for their heights, which vary considerably. They are at:

Tower	Location	Coordinates	Height	Year of built
Stokenchurch BT Tower	Stokenchurch, Buckinghamshire	51.665388°N 0.923827°W	120 m ( 394 ft)	
Charwelton BT Tower	Charwelton, Northamptonshire	52.202327°N 1.251020°W	118 m ( 387 ft)	
Pye Green BT Tower	Pye Green, Staffordshire	52.728687°N 2.019589°W	79 m ( 258 ft)	
Wotton-under-Edge BT Tower	Wotton-under-Edge, Gloucestershire	51.649319°N 2.304024°W	76.2 m ( 250 ft)	
Heaton Park BT Tower	Manchester	53.539611°N 2.255223°W	72.54 m ( 238 ft)	
Sutton Common BT Tower	Macclesfield, Cheshire	53.206135°N 2.100711°W	72 m ( 238 ft)	
Tinshill BT Tower	Cookridge area, Leeds, West Yorkshire	53.854752°N 1.612009°W	60.96 m ( 200 ft)	

The other seven are:

Tower	Location	Coordinates	Height	Year of built
Emley Moor Tower	Huddersfield, West Yorkshire	53.612056°N 1.664414°W	330.5 m ( 1084 ft)	1970
London BT Tower	London	51.5215°N 0.1389°W	188.4 m ( 618 ft)	1964
Birmingham BT Tower	Birmingham	52.483522°N 1.904278°W	152 m ( 499 ft)	1965
Morborne Hill BT Tower	Peterborough, Cambridgeshire	52.507618°N 0.344617°W	98.75 m ( 324 ft)	
Purdown BT Tower	Bristol	51.485244°N 2.562717°W	70.1 m ( 230 ft)	1970
Tolsford Hill BT Tower	Folkestone, Kent	51.107467°N 1.084789°E	67.36 m ( 221 ft)	
Turners Hill BT Tower	Dudley, West Midlands	52.496438°N 2.049005°W	60.96 m ( 200 ft)	

== Mobile phone ==
Below the level of the major telecommunications towers, mobile phone operators run roughly 23,000 base stations. In urban areas, these are almost all rooftop sites or microcells, but in rural areas these are often on towers, frequently owned by BT or Arqiva. The Sitefinder database is an incomplete list of mobile phone base stations in the UK.

Since the discontinuation of the Ofcom sitefinder website in 2015, Estate Systems Ltd have developed a comprehensive site www.mastdata.com for use by the public and mobile operators (subject to a fee) which locates masts within the UK including Northern Ireland.

Arqiva sold its mast business for telecoms to Cellnex. They no longer operate in this area.

== Military ==
There are also numerous military communications sites in the UK, operated by various wings of the armed forces. Many of the masts and towers at military sites are now marketed to commercial site sharers by Arqiva.

== History ==
The first UK microwave relay towers were built in about 1952 for a television link between Manchester and Kirk o'Shotts near Glasgow. A chain of 14 towers, known as "Backbone", running from the Chilterns to Scotland and intended primarily for national defence in the Cold War, was first mentioned publicly in the 1955 Defence White Paper. It announced "The Post Office are planning to build up a special network, both by cable and radio, designed to maintain long distance communication in the event of an attack". It wasn't actually built until the early 1960s, by which time the original Backbone concept had become absorbed into a much larger microwave network built for a mixture of civil and defence traffic including voice, telegraphy, television and radar.

== See also ==
- BT site engineering code
- Radio masts and towers
- Telecommunications in the United Kingdom
- Telecom infrastructure sharing
