= Telecom Tower (disambiguation) =

Telecom Tower refers to one of several telecommunications towers:

- Black Mountain Tower in Canberra (formerly Telecom Tower)
- BT Tower (Birmingham)
- BT Tower in London
