= QCEA =

QCEA may refer to:

- Quaker Council for European Affairs, founded in 1979 to promote the values of the Religious Society of Friends (Quakers) in the European context. QCEA, based in Brussels, is an international, not-for-profit organisation under Belgian law
- BT site engineering code for a site at Carlisle
- QCEA, a set of performance assessment standards for education in Qatar
