= Stokenchurch War Memorial =

War memorial in Buckinghamshire, England

Coordinates: 51.659911°N 0.900297°W

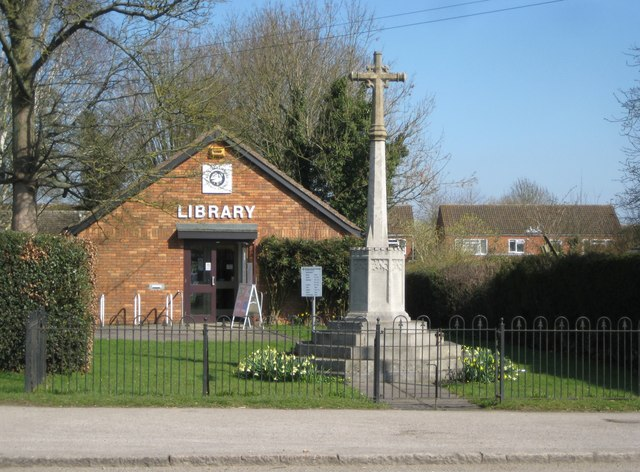
Stokenchurch War Memorial

Stokenchurch War Memorial is located outside the Memorial Hall, Wycombe Road, Stokenchurch, Buckinghamshire, England. It is a grade II listed building with Historic England and commemorates the men of the village who died in the First and Second World Wars. It was built in 1925 alongside a memorial hall erected at the same time on land donated by Marcus Slade Q.C. It includes the names of two women who died during the Second World War, Eleanor Slade, a pilot in the Air Transport Auxiliary who died following a crash in 1944, and Florence Mary Steptoe a private in the Auxiliary Territorial Service who died in 1942.
