= Peterborough transmitting station =

Transmitter station in Peterborough, England

Peterborough
- Morborne Hill site from west

- Location within Cambridgeshire
- Location: Cambridgeshire
- Mast height: 154 metres (505 ft)
- Coordinates: 52.507778°N 0.343333°W
- Grid reference: TL127913
- Built: 5 October 1959 (original); 2006 (current)
- Collapsed: 30 October 2004 (original)

The Peterborough transmitting station is a broadcasting and telecommunications facility at Morborne Hill, near Peterborough, England (grid reference TL127913).

There are two tall structures on adjacent sites: a guyed steel lattice mast belonging to Arqiva, and a 98.45 m (323.0 ft) tall reinforced concrete tower belonging to BT. These sites are known by their owners as 'Peterborough' and 'Morborne Hill' respectively.

== History ==
The site was originally owned by Mr FJ Cheney of Polebrook. It was a 7.5-acre site. On Monday 23 September 1957 a 110-foot experimental aluminium mast was erected to test strength of transmissions around the area, with BBC engineer Colin White of the Field Strength Test Unit. A 560 ft high mast was planned. On Monday 14 October 1957 a war-surplus barrage balloon was flown at 600 ft. Morborne itself was 184 ft high. By November 1957 the test mast was removed. By June 1958, television broadcasts were expected by March 1959.

On Thursday 30 April 1959, the first 40ft part of the mast was installed, weighing 1.5 tons. The rest of the mast was expected to take three weeks. Test broadcasts took place from 21 September 1959. Television came from Sutton Coldfield, via a relay at Skeffington in Leicestershire.

It was the same design and height as Tacolneston. Rowridge, North Hessary Tor and Pontop Pike are a similar design, but built five years earlier.

=== Transmission ===
The 560 ft lattice mast would open on Monday 5 October 1959, with 405 line television. This was the first day of BBC eastern news programmes. The G.P.O. link between Norwich and Morborne would be completed by early December 1959. Broadcasts started at 6am on 5 October 1959. The mast did not carry ITV. ITV reception came from Lichfield or Mendlesham, in central Suffolk.

The Sheerhatch television relay, near Moggerhanger, began operating on Monday 20 November 1967, serving Bedford. It closed in October 1982.

The FM frequencies were the same as today - the BBC Home Service on 94.5 FM and the BBC Third Programme on 92.3 FM. Stereo FM radio came in July 1980, and also Hereward Radio began broadcasting on 95.7 on FM at 6am on Thursday 10 July 1980. For the south of Lincolnshire, this radio broadcast reception would much better than when BBC Radio Lincolnshire began later in the year in November 1980.

== Arqiva mast ==
Original steel lattice mast collapsed, showing contact with building at the base.

A 154-metre (505 ft) guyed high-steel lattice mast, belonging to Arqiva, is used primarily for FM broadcasting but carries many other services.

Originally, this mast was built for broadcasting television on VHF Band I.

On 30 October 2004, the original mast was destroyed by a fire. It collapsed, seriously damaging the transmitter building at the base. Services were temporarily restored by transferring them to the adjacent BT tower and two temporary masts, including the BBC emergency mast which was put in use for the first time. A new replacement mast finished construction in 2006 and is in full service.

== Communications tower ==
In June 1961 the original GPO 328 foot steel lattice tower had reached 100 feet, which weighed 80 tons. It was hoped to be built by the end of June 1961. It would carry around 5,000 telephone circuits. The foundations were 700 tons of reinforced concrete. It connected with a GPO tower 96 miles away, the Heaton Park BT Tower in north Manchester.

The 1961 lattice GPO tower was replaced in September 1970 by a 280 ft concrete tower, built by Monk of Warrington, as more communication dishes were needed, with 9,000 more trunk circuits being needed.

== Services available ==
=== Analogue radio ===
Frequency	kW	Service
90.1 MHz	40	BBC Radio 2
92.3 MHz	40	BBC Radio 3
94.5 MHz	40	BBC Radio 4
95.7 MHz	5.1	BBC Radio Cambridgeshire
99.7 MHz	40	BBC Radio 1
101.9 MHz	40	Classic FM

=== Digital radio ===
Frequency	Block	kW	Operator
216.928 MHz	11A	5	SDL National
221.352 MHz	11D	5	Digital One
225.648 MHz	12B	10	BBC National DAB
229.072 MHz	12D	4	NOW Peterborough

|66.75 MHz BBC One

== BT concrete tower ==
The adjacent tower is one of fourteen reinforced concrete towers owned by BT in the UK. It is used mainly for point-to-point microwave links and forms part of BT's national telecommunications network. It was not damaged by the collapse of the Arqiva mast.

== See also ==
- British Telecom microwave network
- List of catastrophic collapses of broadcast masts and towers
- List of radio stations in the United Kingdom
- List of tallest structures
- List of tallest structures in the United Kingdom
- List of tallest towers
- Radio masts and towers
- Telecommunications in the United Kingdom
- Telecommunications towers in the United Kingdom
