= Signal 2 =

Greatest Hits Radio Staffordshire and Cheshire
- Birmingham; United Kingdom
- Broadcast area: North Staffordshire and East Cheshire
- Frequencies: FM: 96.4 MHz (Congleton); 96.9 MHz (Stafford); DAB: 12D (Staffordshire and Cheshire)
- RDS: GRT_HITS
- Branding: The Good Times Sound Like This; Across Staffordshire and Cheshire

Programming
- Format: Classic Hits
- Network: Greatest Hits Radio

Ownership
- Owner: Bauer Media Audio UK
- Sister stations: Hits Radio Staffordshire & Cheshire

History
- First air date: 5 September 1983
- Former names: Signal Radio; Signal Gold; Signal 2 BIG 1170
- Former frequencies: 1170 MW

Links
- Website: Greatest Hits Radio

Greatest Hits Radio Staffordshire and Cheshire is an Independent Local Radio station based in Birmingham, England owned and operated by Bauer Radio as part of the Greatest Hits Radio network. It broadcasts to the West Midlands. The station forms part of Greatest Hits Radio Midlands.

== History ==
Signal 2 logo used from 2010 to 2016.

The station began as Signal Radio which first broadcast at 6 a.m., 5 September 1983, with DJ John Evington selecting Neil Diamond's "Beautiful Noise" as its first track. The station initially broadcast on 104.3 MHz and 1170 kHz (a wavelength of 257 metres, with the phrase "2 5 7" becoming a distinctive leitmotif), changing to 102.6 MHz soon after. The station's name is derived from "Signal" the name of the newspaper in Arnold Bennett's local novels.

In the late 1980s the Independent Broadcasting Authority ordered stations to provide different services on their AM and FM outputs, and 1992 saw the launch of a "Golden Breakfast Show" on the 1170 AM frequency while for the rest of the day it would take the main Signal Radio service. On 18 January 1993 a full-time station, Signal Gold, was launched.

In February 2019, Signal 2 was sold to Bauer Radio.

== Technical ==
The station's former 1170 AM transmitter is at Sideway, near to the A500 D Road, just south of the A50 junction. It previously transmitted 200 watts of power and could be heard throughout most of Staffordshire and Cheshire. This transmitter was closed in January 2023. Greatest Hits Radio is also broadcast on the local Stoke and Stafford from transmitters at Alsagers Bank, Pye Green BT Tower, Sutton Common BT Tower, Staffordshire HQ and Tick Hill.

== Programming ==
The majority of Signal 2's programming was produced and presented from its Stoke-on-Trent studios. The nightly late show was simulcast with Wireless Group's AM and FM stations while a syndicated show from Chris Country Radio aired on Sunday afternoons.

=== News ===
Bauer's Staffordshire and Cheshire news team delivers local news bulletins hourly from 6am to 7pm on weekdays and from 7am to 1pm at weekends. Headlines are broadcast on the half-hour during weekday breakfast and drivetime shows, alongside traffic bulletins. National bulletins from Sky News Radio are carried at other times. The news team includes a roving reporter who sources and delivers reports from across the patch, predominately in heartland areas like Stoke-on-Trent, Newcastle-under-Lyme, Stafford and Crewe.

== Frequencies ==
- East Cheshire – 96.4 FM
- Staffordshire – 96.9 FM &
  DAB: 12D (Stoke & Stafford (DAB Multiplex))
