= Purdown BT Tower =

Telecommunications tower in Bristol, England

Purdown
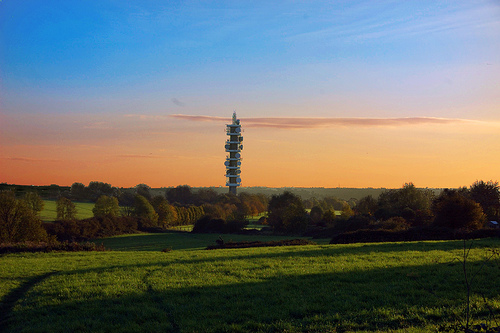
- The tower seen from the north in 2006, before removal of the microwave dishes

- Location within Bristol
- Location: Bristol
- Coordinates: 51.485278°N 2.562778°W
- Grid reference: ST610764
- Built: 1970

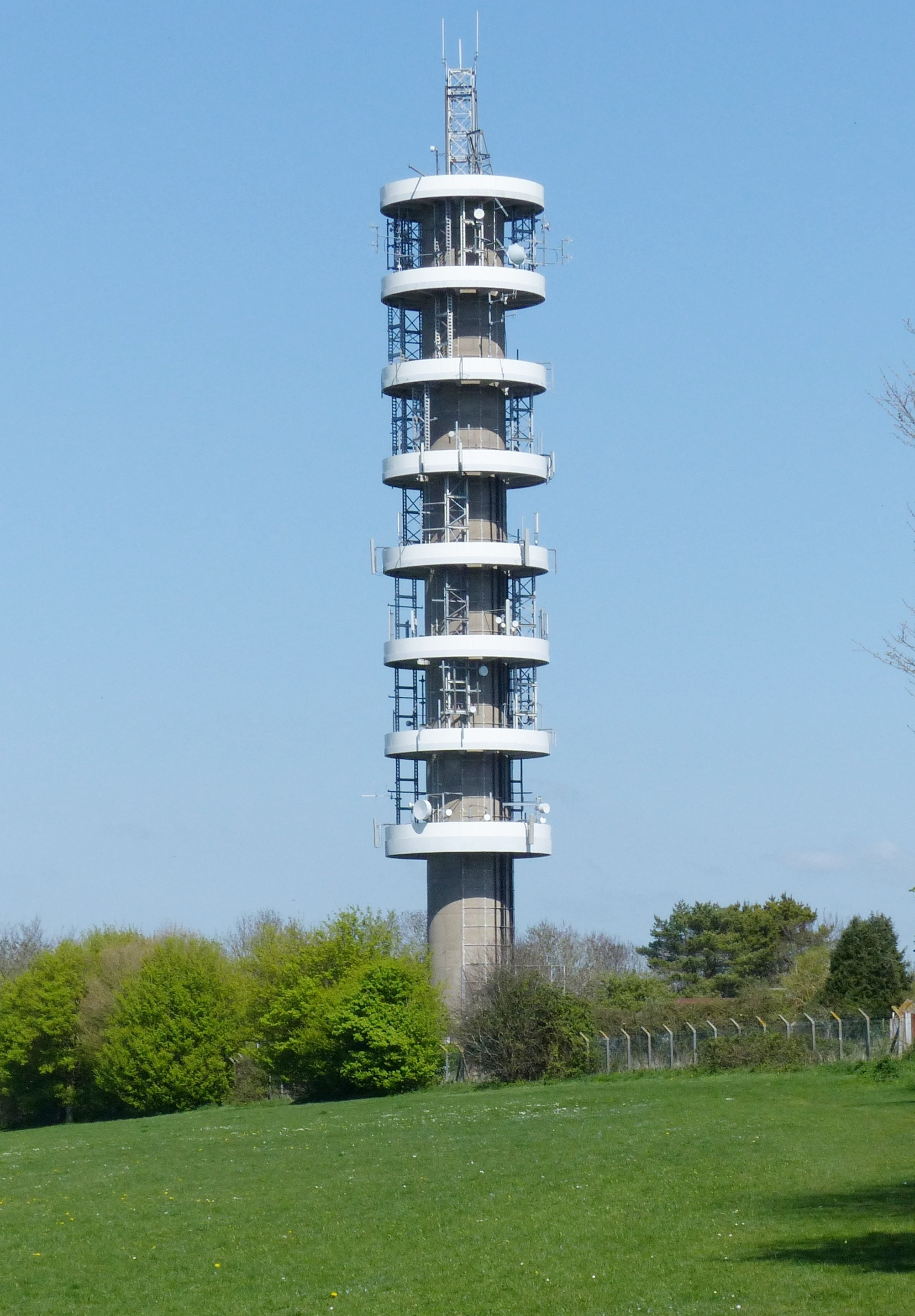
The tower in 2015, after removal of the microwave dishes and installation of modern broadcast and mobile network equipment.

Purdown BT Tower, also known as Purdown Transmitter (sometimes written as Pur Down), is a 70.1 metres (230 ft) tall telecommunications tower in Bristol, England. Built in 1970 for the British Telecom microwave network, it is now used to transmit radio and provide mobile phone coverage.

The tower is located on a hill, Purdown, in Stoke Park in the Lockleaze suburb, about 2 miles (3.2 km) north of the city centre. It is a prominent landmark visible from many areas of the city, and from major transport routes on the approach to the city, including the M32 motorway and Filton Bank railway. The tower is recorded as a Valued Landmark by Bristol City Council, and it has been featured in locally-produced media, such as the opening sequence of TV series Skins (2008).

It is one of fourteen reinforced concrete towers owned by BT in the UK.

== History ==
A temporary steel-lattice tower was built on the site in 1961, ready for the commencement of the GPO (later to become BT) microwave network, which used a network of point-to-point microwave links. The reinforced concrete tower was built in 1969–1971, using a design modified from the GPO's "Chilterns type", pioneered at the Stokenchurch BT Tower.

Much of the BT microwave network became redundant after the rollout of fibreoptic infrastructure, and, like many other BT towers in the 2000s, the redundant dishes were removed from Purdown in 2008.

== Current uses ==
As of 2022, the tower remains in the ownership of BT, with space leased to various companies for broadcast and mobile communications infrastructure.

Arqiva use the tower to broadcast BBC and commercial radio on FM and DAB to the city.

=== Analogue radio (VHF FM) ===
Frequency	kW	Service	Notes
97.2 MHz	0.1	Hits Radio West of England	Bristol frequency previously used by Kiss.
101.4 MHz	0.1	Classic FM	Still broadcasting on this frequency today.
107.2 MHz	0.5	Greatest Hits Radio Bristol & The South West	Bristol frequency previously used by The Breeze.

=== Digital radio (DAB) ===
Frequency	Block	kW	Operator
222.064 MHz	11D	1	Digital One
225.648 MHz	12B	1	BBC National DAB

== In popular culture ==
The tower played a prominent part in the series finale of BBC Three's 2016 drama series Thirteen, starring Jodie Comer. In her video for the song "Heels", British musician Billy Nomates (Tor Maries) repeatedly dances with the tower in the background.

== See also ==
- Telecommunications towers in the United Kingdom
- List of towers
