= Wotton-under-Edge BT Tower =

Telecommunications tower in Wotton-under-Edge, Gloucestershire, England

Wotton-under-Edge
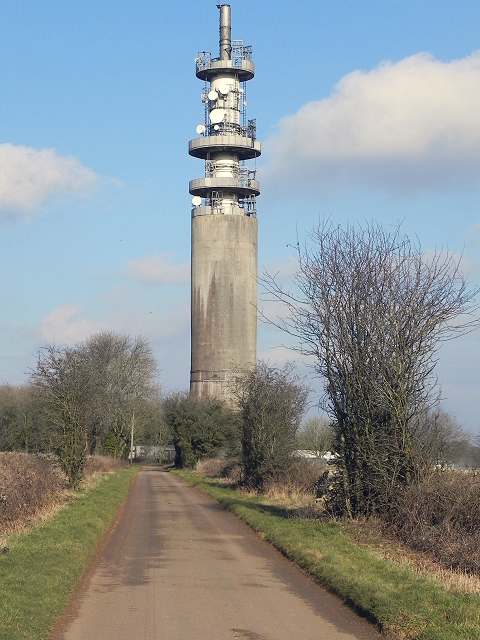

- Location within Gloucestershire
- Location: Wotton-under-Edge, Gloucestershire
- Coordinates: 51.649306°N 2.304028°W
- Grid reference: ST7896794596

Wotton-under-Edge Tower is a 76.2 metres ( 250 ft) tall telecommunication tower built of reinforced concrete at Wotton-under-Edge in Gloucestershire, UK. Wotton-under-Edge Tower is one of the few British towers built of reinforced concrete.

== See also ==
- British Telecom microwave network
- Telecommunications towers in the United Kingdom
