= BT Tower, Birmingham =

Telecommunications tower in England

BT Tower
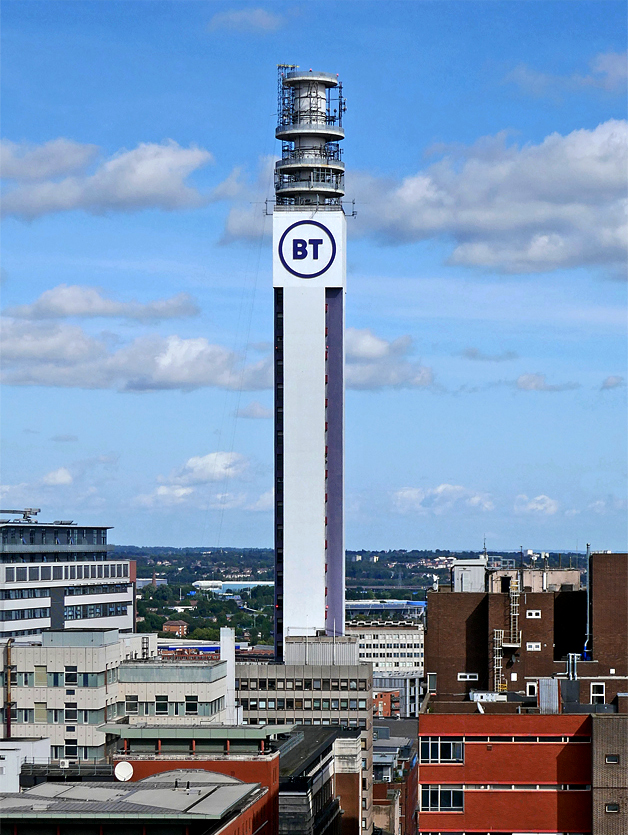
- The tower in September 2021

Record height
- Tallest in Birmingham from 1965 to 2024^{[I]}
- Preceded by: Joseph Chamberlain Memorial Clock Tower
- Surpassed by: Octagon and One Eastside

General information
- Type: Telecommunications tower
- Location: 40 Lionel Street, Birmingham, England
- Coordinates: 52°29′0.31″N 1°54′15.95″W
- Construction started: July 1963
- Completed: September 1965

Height
- Roof: 140 metres (460 ft)

Technical details
- Floor count: 31

Design and construction
- Architects: Ministry of Public Building and Works

The BT Tower, formerly known as the Post Office Tower and the GPO Tower, is a landmark and telecommunications tower in Birmingham, England. Until 2024 it was the tallest structure in the city, being surpassed by the topping out of both the Octagon and One Eastside that year, which now share the title. Its Post Office code was YBMR.

== History ==
The first microwave telecommunications relay in Birmingham, set up in 1949, used a metal tower on the roof of Telephone House, a 1930s building near to the eventual site of the BT Tower, and also on Lionel Street.

Construction of the tower, then known as the Post Office Tower as it was built for the General Post Office, which operated the UK's telephone service, commenced in July 1963 and was completed in September 1965. The tower became operational in December 1966 and was officially opened by the Lord Mayor of Birmingham, Alderman James S. Meadows, on 5 October 1967. It was designed by the Ministry of Public Building and Works and M.H. Bristow was the senior architect. It has 26 storeys, housing technical areas and offices, and five levels of circular aerial galleries at the top. There is a roof-mounted crane.

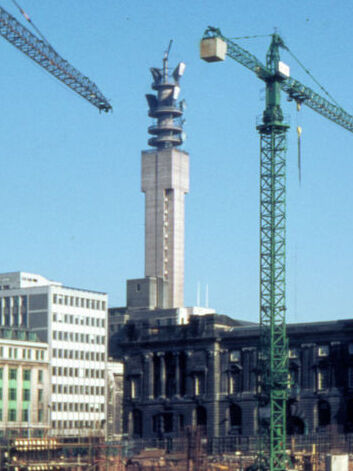
The tower in 1969, with original antennae attached

The original intention was to build a circular tower similar to the London one but without the public floors above the aerial galleries. At one time the Post Office wanted to increase the height from 500 feet (150 m), which had been agreed by the Ministry of Aviation, to 600 feet (180 m). This was refused in order to avoid non-standard procedures for aircraft approaching Birmingham Airport from the north-west. Cost over-runs on the London tower led to a review of the Birmingham design, and then it was decided to use a circular design of the 'Chilterns' type as used at Stokenchurch, Charwelton, Pye Green, Sutton Common, Heaton Park and Tinshill radio stations, but with the internal diameter increased from 32 feet (9.8 m) to 37 feet (11 m) to provide sufficient space on the equipment floors. The square design, as built, was proposed for aesthetic reasons by the Chief Architect of the Ministry of Public Building and Works.

The tower was designed to be stable in high winds. Channels at each corner funnel the wind to counteract the force of the wind swaying the structure. A stable platform is necessary so that the microwave dishes mounted on the side of the structure keep line of sight with the remote transmitter they are communicating with.

There were two steel rails on one wall on which a trolley was designed to run to carry the dishes up to the aerial galleries. The original horn dishes were too heavy for the roof mounted crane to lift and had to be stripped down: even in this state they were only just under the crane's maximum load capacity.

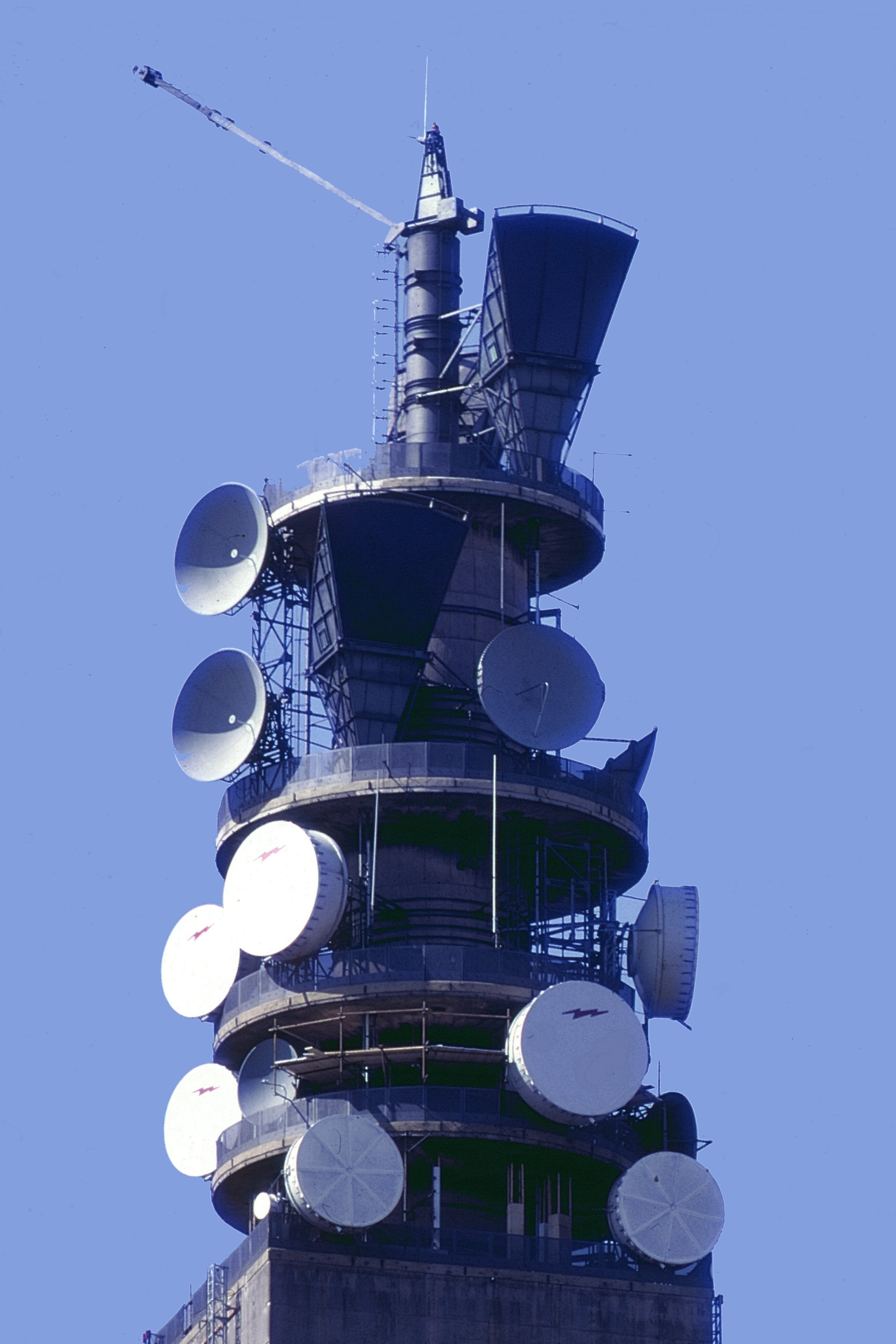
Aerial galleries with dishes and crane, seen in August 1983

The ability to lift dishes was dependent on the weather and to complicate matters, the steel rails only went to the bottom of the first aerial gallery. To get the dishes higher a steel cable system was used that was mounted on poles. When the trolley reached the aerial gallery it had to be disconnected from the rails and swung out to attach to the cables.

In August 2003, the tower was painted an ultramarine blue to cover the existing light brown which had started to discolour. The balconies were painted a dark shade of blue. On 18 March 2004, local comedian Jasper Carrott switched on the night-time illuminations of the tower in response to Birmingham City Council's policy of encouraging the illumination of local landmarks.

The tower is home to a pair of peregrine falcons, with a webcam installed in 2010.

On 5 February 2012, the last of the large analogue aerial dishes was removed following a migration to digital transmission. Around eighty smaller dishes remain.

In 2020, scaffolding surrounded the tower as the structure underwent some refurbishments. These improvements included removing older satellite dishes and antennas that were no longer in use. This subsequently reduced the height of the overall tower from 152m to 140m. The refurbishment was completed in May 2022.

== Floors ==
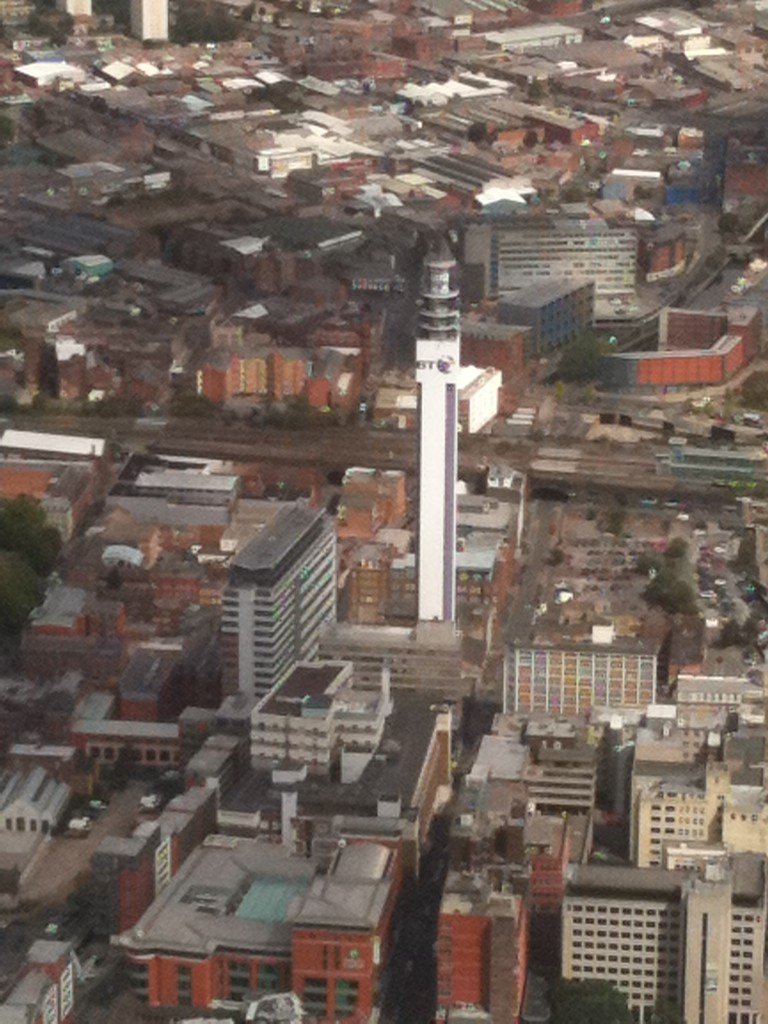
Seen from the West Midlands Police helicopter, November 2011

There are 24 equipment height floors (10 feet 6 inches or 3.20 metres in height), a Band Branching area (Floor 25) – the square section seen from outside, which is approximately double the normal floor height, followed by five aerial galleries.

Floor numbering used YBMR/A followed by the actual floor number +1, i.e. the Ground Floor was YBMR/A1 etc. The aerial galleries were labelled YBMR/B1-5.

== Events ==
On 9th May 1986, a team of 14 police officers and three Royal Marines abseiled down the BT Tower to raise money for Acorns Children’s Hospice. It was the first time anyone has abseiled down the 140-metre tower which, at the time, was the tallest landmark in Birmingham.

The abseil, which raised more than £5,000, was coordinated by PC Wayne Claridge, a police officer from B Unit at Steel House Lane Police Station.

The Royal Marines provided training and safety kit for the officers, many of whom hadn’t abseiled before. Hill House Hammond Insurance sponsored the team, providing blue tracksuits for the event. Longbridge-based Austin Rover provided transport for local dignitaries who attended the event including; The Mayor of Birmingham, Jeff Lynne from the Birmingham-based band ELO, Stephanie Turner, from the TV series Juliet Bravo, and Tony Butler from BBC Radio WM. The Birmingham Post, the Evening Mail, Radio WM and the regional news all covered the event.

== See also ==
- List of tallest buildings and structures in Birmingham
- Anchor Exchange
