= Charwelton BT Tower =

Telecommunication tower in England

Charwelton
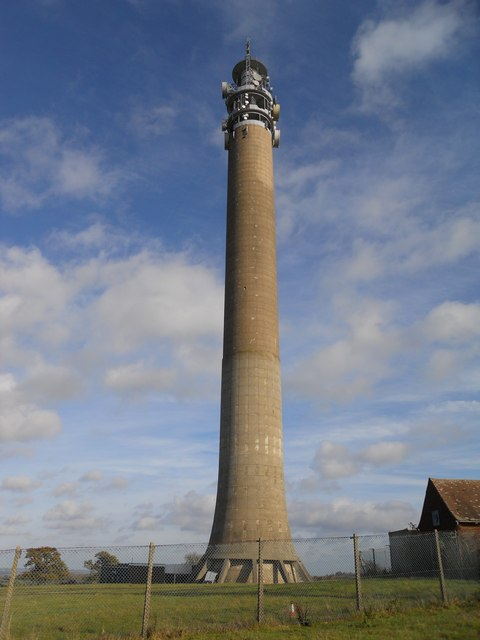

- Location within Northamptonshire
- Location: Charwelton, Byfield, Northamptonshire
- Tower height: 118 metres (387 ft)
- Coordinates: 52.202319°N 1.251019°W
- Grid reference: SP5118056319

Charwelton BT Tower is a telecommunication tower built of reinforced concrete at Charwelton near Byfield, Northamptonshire, England. It is 118 metres (387 ft) tall and one of the few British towers built of reinforced concrete. It is a landmark for miles around.

In 1984, a SEPECAT Jaguar struck the Charwelton BT Tower, ripping off part of its wing and requiring an emergency landing.

== See also ==
- British Telecom microwave network
- Telecommunications towers in the United Kingdom
- Stokenchurch BT Tower
