= British Telecom microwave network =

UK point-to-point microwave system

The British Telecom microwave network was a network of point-to-point microwave radio links in the United Kingdom, operated at first by the General Post Office, and subsequently by its successor BT plc. From the late 1950s to the 1980s it provided a large part of BT's trunk communications capacity, and carried telephone, television and radar signals and digital data, both civil and military. Its use of line-of-sight microwave transmission was particularly important during the Cold War for its resilience against nuclear attack. It was rendered obsolete, at least for normal civilian purposes, by the installation of a national optical fibre communication network with considerably higher reliability and vastly greater capacity.

BT remains one of the largest owners of transmission and microwave towers in the UK. The most famous of these is the BT Tower in London, which was the tallest building in the UK from its construction in the 1960s until the early 1980s, and a major node in the BT microwave network.

== Television links ==
The earliest operational GPO microwave links were provided for 405-line BBC television.

=== Experimental systems ===
==== London to Birmingham pre-war ====
In 1939 the Post Office placed a contract with EMI for an experiment in the relaying of television signals to Birmingham. In this case, the signals from Alexandra Palace were to be received at Dunstable and transmitted over a radio link to Sharmans Hill, Charwelton, some 40 miles distant towards Birmingham; thus carrying the signal two-thirds of the way from London to Birmingham. World War II intervened and this early experiment had to be abandoned.

==== London to Castleton 195 MHz ====
The GPO built an experimental chain of radio relay stations for television, which used the relatively low VHF frequency of 195 MHz and frequency modulation with a deviation of 6 MHz per volt. Each relay station consisted essentially of back-to-back rhombic antennas on opposite sides of a hilltop, connected via an amplifier. The frequency was not changed. The system was first tested on 24 March 1949. The stations were at:

- Rowley Lodge, near Barnet, Hertfordshire
- Green Hailey, Buckinghamshire
- Widley, Hampshire
- Hook, Hampshire
- Wotton-under-Edge, Gloucestershire
- Post Office Radio Laboratory at Castleton, Monmouthshire

==== London to Castleton 4 GHz ====
The GPO built an experimental 4 GHz system, which was used operationally to feed TV pictures to the Wenvoe transmitter during its first four months on air in late 1952, until a coaxial feed became available. Some of the equipment from this link was recovered, refurbished, modified and used to provide a permanent link from London to Rowridge, Isle of Wight in 1954.

=== London to Birmingham 900 MHz ===
A chain of stations was built between telephone exchanges in London and Birmingham to connect the Sutton Coldfield transmitting station to Alexandra Palace. The contract for this was placed with GEC in mid-1947. The stations were at:

- London Museum exchange
- Harrow Weald, Middlesex
- Zouches Farm, Bedfordshire
- Charwelton, Northamptonshire
- Turner's Hill, Staffordshire
- Telephone House, Birmingham

=== Manchester to Kirk o'Shotts ===
The GPO placed a contract in July 1950 for a chain of microwave links to feed BBC television from Manchester to the Kirk o' Shotts transmitting station. This was the first permanent GPO system to use the 4 GHz band. The chain was routed near the east coast in order to be close to Leeds, Newcastle and Edinburgh. The stations were at:

- Manchester Telephone House
- Windy Hill, Lancashire
- Tinshill, Yorkshire
- Arncliffe Wood, Yorkshire
- Pontop Pike, County Durham
- Corby's Crags, Northumberland
- Blackcastle Hill, East Lothian
- Blackford Hill, Edinburgh
- Kirk o' Shotts, Lanarkshire

== Backbone ==
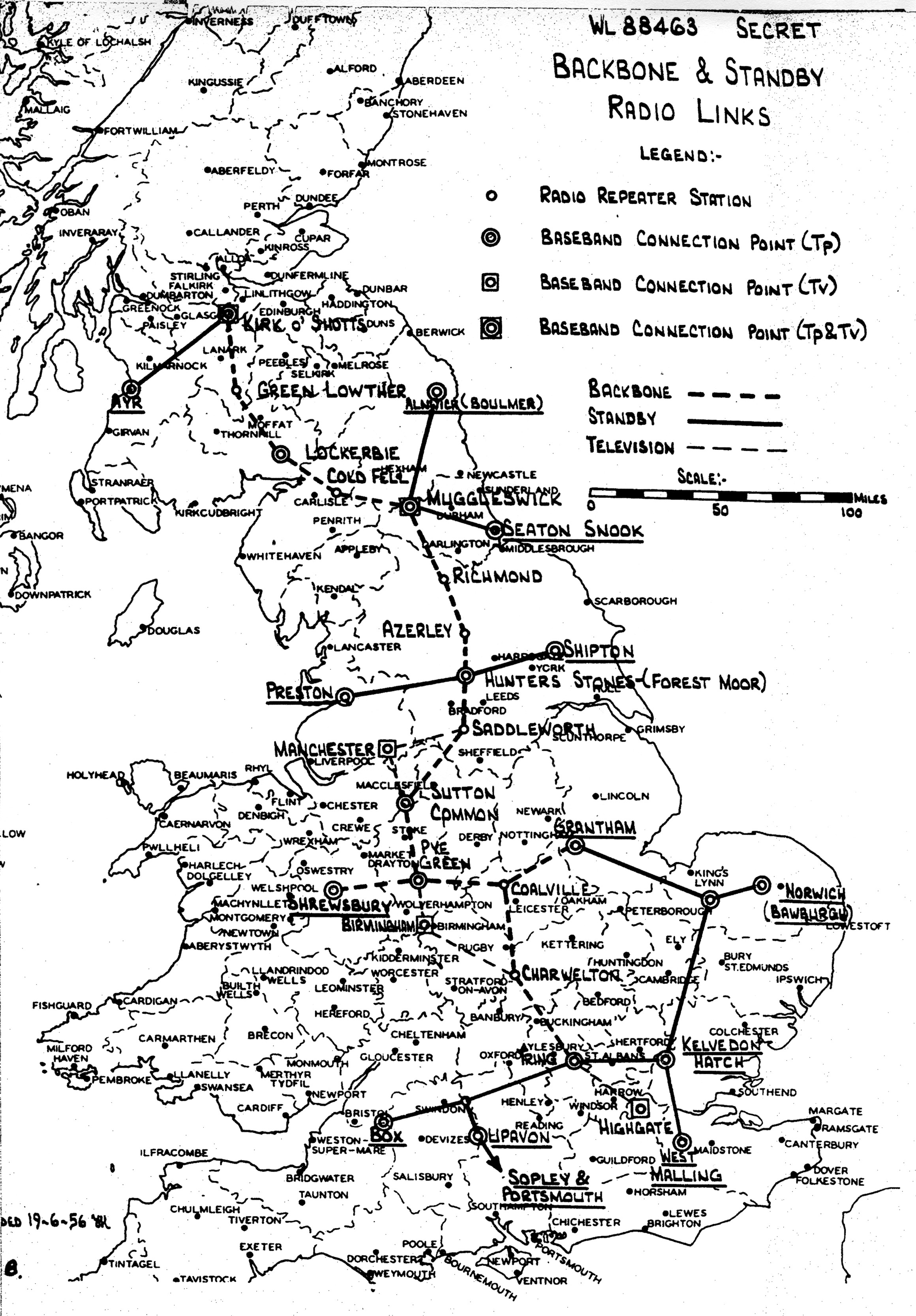
Backbone as proposed in 1956

The term 'backbone' is often applied to the core of a communications network, i.e. the part that provides high-capacity links over long distances between major nodes. In the early 1950s, the term was used by the General Post Office (BT's predecessor) to describe a chain of microwave links designed to provide resilient communications in the event of nuclear war. It was originally designed as a chain of stations between south-east England and Scotland.

The exact location of the Backbone sites changed as the project developed, but in July 1956 there were 14 planned sites at (from south to north):

- Tring, Hertfordshire
- Charwelton, Northamptonshire
- Coalville (Copt Oak), Leicestershire
- Pye Green, Staffordshire
- Sutton Common, Cheshire
- Saddleworth, Yorkshire
- Hunters Stones, at Norwood near Menwith Hill which is between Harrogate (6 miles) and Skipton (14 miles), Yorkshire
- Azerley, Yorkshire
- Richmond, Yorkshire
- Muggleswick, Co. Durham
- Cold Fell, Cumberland
- Lockerbie, Dumfriesshire
- Green Lowther, Dumfriesshire
- Kirk o' Shotts, Lanarkshire (GPO site near BBC site)

Two additional 'backbone spur' sites were planned for Shrewsbury and Grantham (Carlton Scroop), which connected to the main Backbone spine at Pye Green and Coalville (Copt Oak) respectively.

== Radio standby to line ==
The 1956 plan also described a series of links called 'radio standby to line'. These were spur links between the GPO backbone sites and defence 'customer' sites. They were designed to carry between 25 and 150 'private wire' (a.k.a. leased line) circuits each, by radio. The paper contains a list of sites and a network map, showing the following radio standby to line links:

- Kirk o' Shotts to Gailes ground-controlled interception (GCI) radar station near Ayr
- Muggleswick to Boulmer GCI station, Royal Observer Corps and regional communications, Seaton Snook GCI station
- Hunters Stones to Forest Moor Admiralty radio receiving station, Shipton RAF Sector Operations Centre (SOC), Preston SOC, Regional Commissioner's HQ and Admiralty radio transmitting station
- Grantham to RAF bomber bases and US Air Force bases
- Norwich to RAF SOC (Bawburgh), US Air Force bases, GCI stations, naval headquarters, continental communications
- Kelvedon Hatch, Essex to RAF SOC, RAF bomber stations, RAF radar stations
- West Malling, Kent to naval headquarters at Chatham and Dover, RAF radar and Fighter Command headquarters, continental communications
- Upavon, Wiltshire to Army establishments on Salisbury Plain
- Sopley and Portsmouth to naval headquarters at Portsmouth and naval radio stations at Horsea and Flowerdown
- Box, Wiltshire to Admiralty establishment at Bath, RAF SOC and Signals centre, Army signals centres at Cheltenham and Droitwich and Army radio stations, Foreign Office GCHQ and radio stations, important radio stations and miscellaneous radar stations in south-west England, South Wales and the Border Counties.

== Aerials and towers ==
Various types of aerial have been used in the network's history. At first, prime-focus parabolic reflectors were used. In about 1960, dual-band horn aerials started to be used widely, and a few of these survive to the present day. They began to go out of fashion at the end of the 1960s, when types of parabolic antenna with an improved performance became available.

Many of the towers were designed with particular types of aerial in mind. Often they were designed to carry horn aerials but no longer do so.

== See also ==
- Microwave radio relay
