= Stokenchurch =

Village in Buckinghamshire, England

Coordinates: 51.659°N 0.896°W

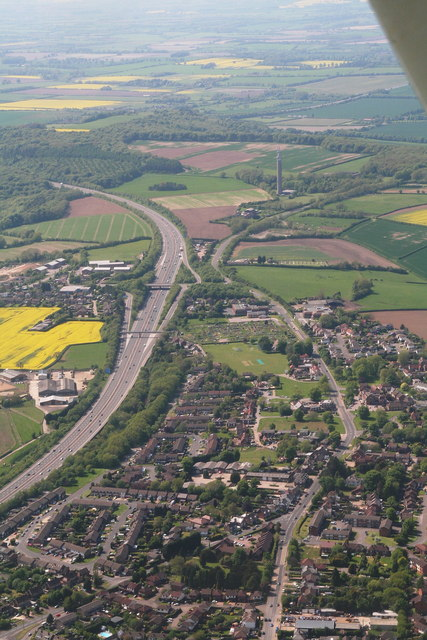
- Aerial view of Stokenchurch, with the M40 motorway at left, and the Stokenchurch BT Tower visible to the upper right

- Location within Buckinghamshire
- Population: 4,801 (2011)
- OS grid reference: SU763962
  - London: 35 miles (56 km) ESE
- Civil parish: Stokenchurch
- Unitary authority: Buckinghamshire
- Ceremonial county: Buckinghamshire
- Region: South East
- Country: England
- Sovereign state: United Kingdom
- Post town: HIGH WYCOMBE
- Postcode district: HP14
- Dialling code: 01494
- Police: Thames Valley
- Fire: Buckinghamshire
- Ambulance: South Central
- UK Parliament: Mid Buckinghamshire constituency,

Stokenchurch is a village and civil parish in south-west Buckinghamshire, England. It is located in the Chiltern Hills, about 3 miles (5 km) south of Chinnor in Oxfordshire and 6 miles (10 km) west of High Wycombe. Stokenchurch is a commuter village, served by junction 5 of the M40 motorway to London, Oxford and Birmingham. The Stokenchurch BT Tower, to the west of the village, is a highly visible landmark on the edge of the Chilterns and pinpoints the village's location for miles ahead.

== History ==
The village name is Old English in origin, although there is a difference of opinion among scholars as to its original meaning. Patrick Hanks points out that 13th-century manorial records describe the village as Stockenechurch, which would logically come from OE stoccen + cirice, literally "logs church". This therefore means, he argues, that the village's name originated from a description of a church made from logs. However Starey and Viccars, in their study of the village point to the geography of the local area and the fact that in 1086 Stokenchurch was a woodland in the chapelry of Aston Rowant in Oxfordshire. They present the Hanks opinion as a credible origin however argue that due to the geography the name is more likely to come from the alternative meaning for the Anglo Saxon word stocc, which is an outlying farm or secondary settlement.

The guide to the parish church, on sale in the church in the late 1970s (but no publishing information); mentions a battle fought between the locals and Danes on nearby Beacon Hill in the year 914 AD. It is said that where juniper grows blood has been spilt – there is certainly much juniper on Beacon Hill.

The site of the village (being on the main London to Oxford road) proved a good resting and changing place for horses. For this reason in the Civil War it was commonly used as a resting place for both Royalist and Parliamentarian troops. Being between Royalist Oxford and Parliamentarian London the village is mentioned no less than twelve times in the journal of Scoutmaster General Sir Samuel Luke between 1643 and 1644, and on two occasions (on 5 December 1642 and 17 June 1643) skirmishes broke out when both sides arrived at the village together.

The original road is now a bridleway, called Colliers Lane (in original local dialect Coiyers Lane); the current road having been constructed in 1824. It was the use of the village as a stopping point that led to many of the pubs and inns being established.

By the early 13th century Stokenchurch was a chapelry in the parish of Aston Rowant. It was made a separate parish in 1844 and was transferred to Buckinghamshire from Oxfordshire in 1896. It was once a centre for chair making with much of the wood used being felled locally. By the 1930s there were seven or eight firms making chairs for sale to major furniture makers. Despite this, the village was not overly rich, being largely based on a farming community.

In 1989, "the centre of the wider village, which is characterised by large areas of common to both sides of the main road" was designated a conservation area.

Since 2011, Garsington Opera, an annual open air summer opera festival is held just across the M40 at Wormsley Park.

== Churches ==
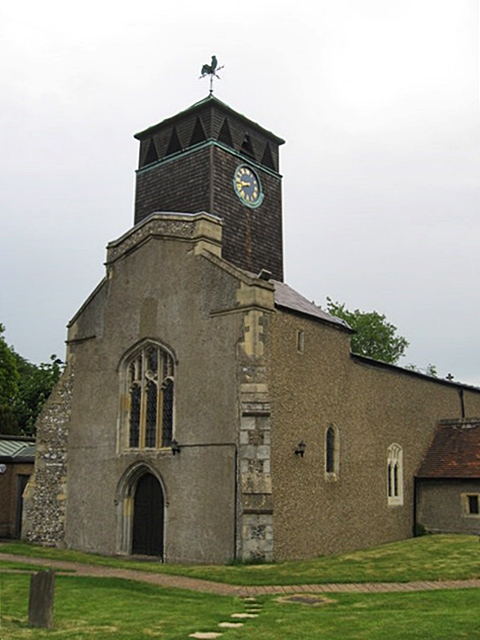
St Peter and St Paul's church, Stokenchurch

The Church of England parish church of St Peter and St Paul has a Norman west tower and numerous late-13th and early-14th century features. The outer walls are covered in modern pebbledash. The north aisle and belltower were added in 1893.

Stokenchurch's Methodist chapel, built 1893–96, possibly by T. Colbourne of Swindon, is one of the most elaborate in Buckinghamshire. The chapel was closed in 2019 due to a declining congregation, and was put up for sale the following year.

== Pubs and inns ==
Stokenchurch's main landmark is the King's Hotel (formerly the King's Arms Hotel), where King Charles II is reputed to have stayed with his mistress in the 17th century. The front of the hotel is 20th century. The building sustained serious damage in a fire on the night of 8 October 2021.

Most other pubs and inns from the horse changing heyday have now closed, the latest being the Four Horseshoes, turned into private dwellings in 2012. This leaves only the small Royal Oak (now operating as a Nepalese restaurant, Gurkha Hut) near the church and the larger and more prominently located Fleur de Lis facing the King's Hotel across the village common and A40. Parts of the Fleur de Lis date back to the 16th century. It also hosted a very popular music festival on the common called Fleur Fest for about ten years until 2014.

== Other amenities ==
Stokenchurch has a primary school, a library and a fire station. There are also a few shops and a petrol station.

2002 saw the completion of the first phase of the Stokenchurch Business Park next to the motorway junction which is home to a few medium-sized businesses.

== Wildlife ==
Stokenchurch is one of the places in the United Kingdom where one can frequently see the red kite, a formerly endangered species whose numbers are now recovering well, though still in isolated pockets such as the Chilterns and West Wales. They were reintroduced to the area by the RSPB and English Nature with assistance from Paul Getty, the American millionaire and philanthropist, who allowed use of the Wormsley estate.

== Notable residents ==
- Glyn Cannon – playwright
- Richard Hickox CBE – conductor of choral, orchestral and operatic music.

== Sources ==
- Pevsner, Nikolaus (1973) [1960]. Buckinghamshire. The Buildings of England. Harmondsworth: Penguin Books. pp. 244–245. ISBN 0-14-071019-1.
- Pevsner, Nikolaus; Williamson, Elizabeth (1994). Buckinghamshire. The Buildings of England (2 ed.). Harmondsworth: Penguin Books. pp. 650–651. ISBN 0140710620.
