= Tinshill BT Tower =

Telecommunication tower in Leeds, England

Tinshill
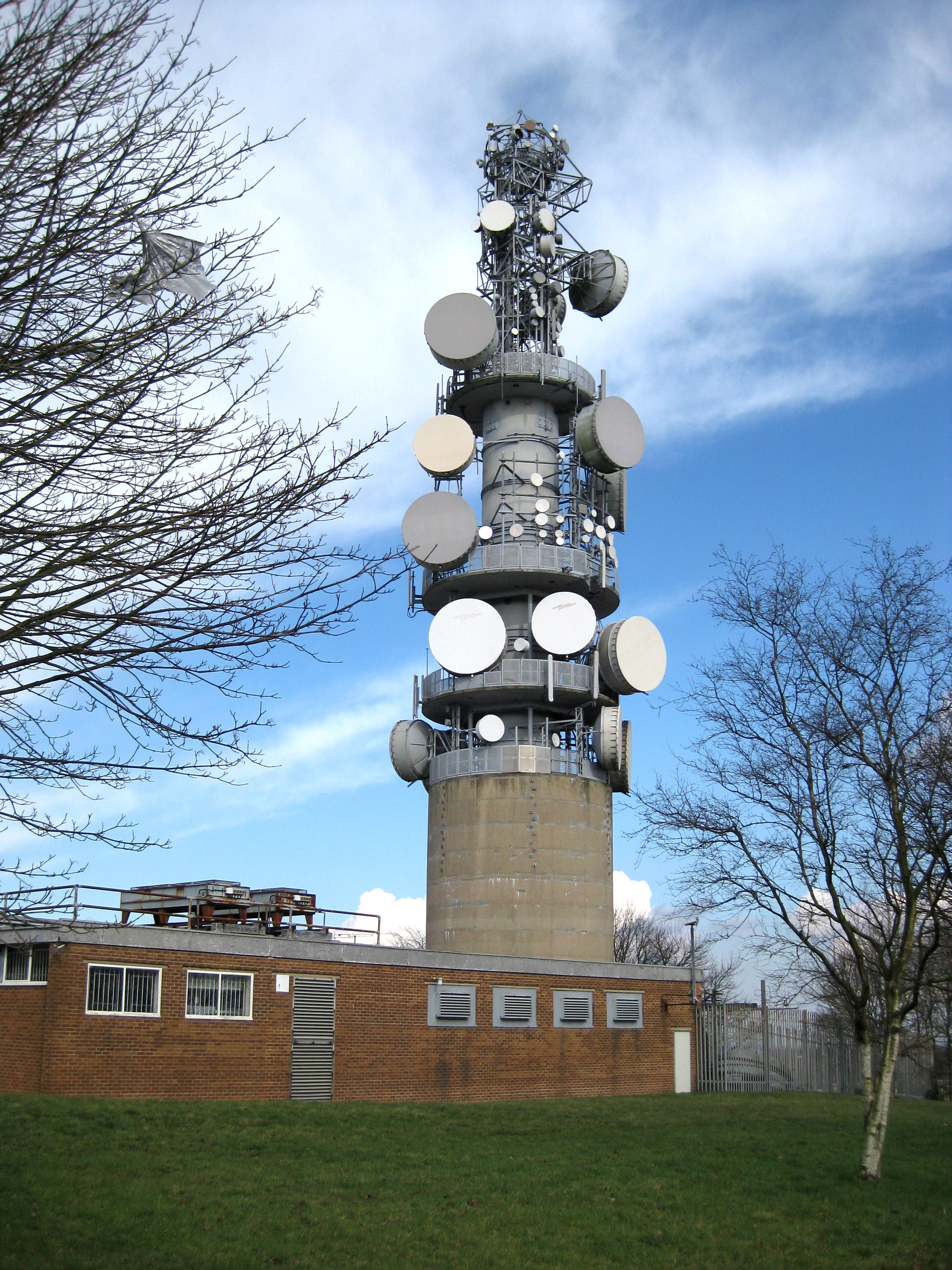
- Tinshill BT Tower viewed from southwest

- Location within West Yorkshire
- Location: Leeds, West Yorkshire
- Coordinates: 53.854722°N 1.611944°W
- Grid reference: SE2552239925

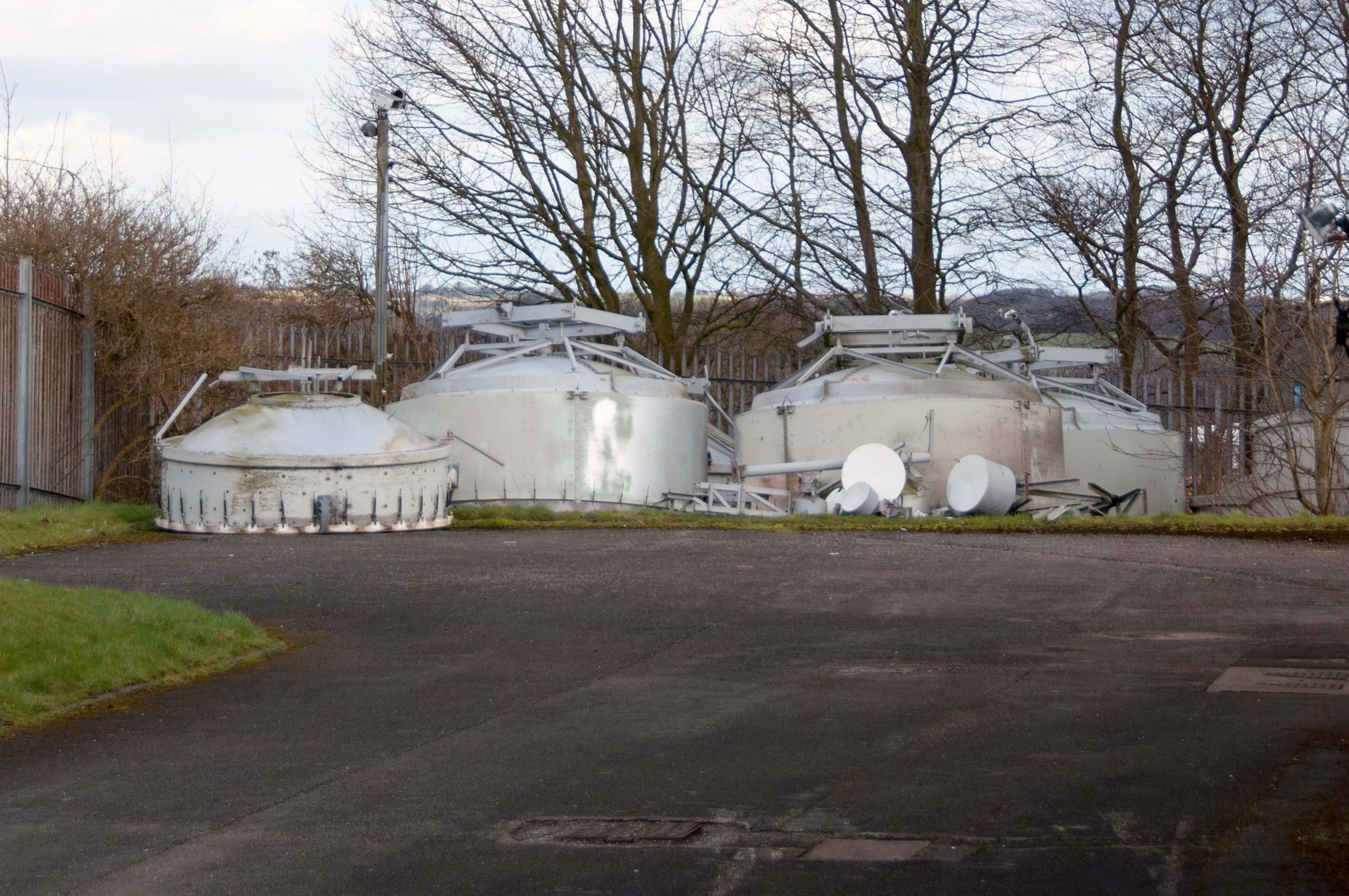
Large dishes on the ground

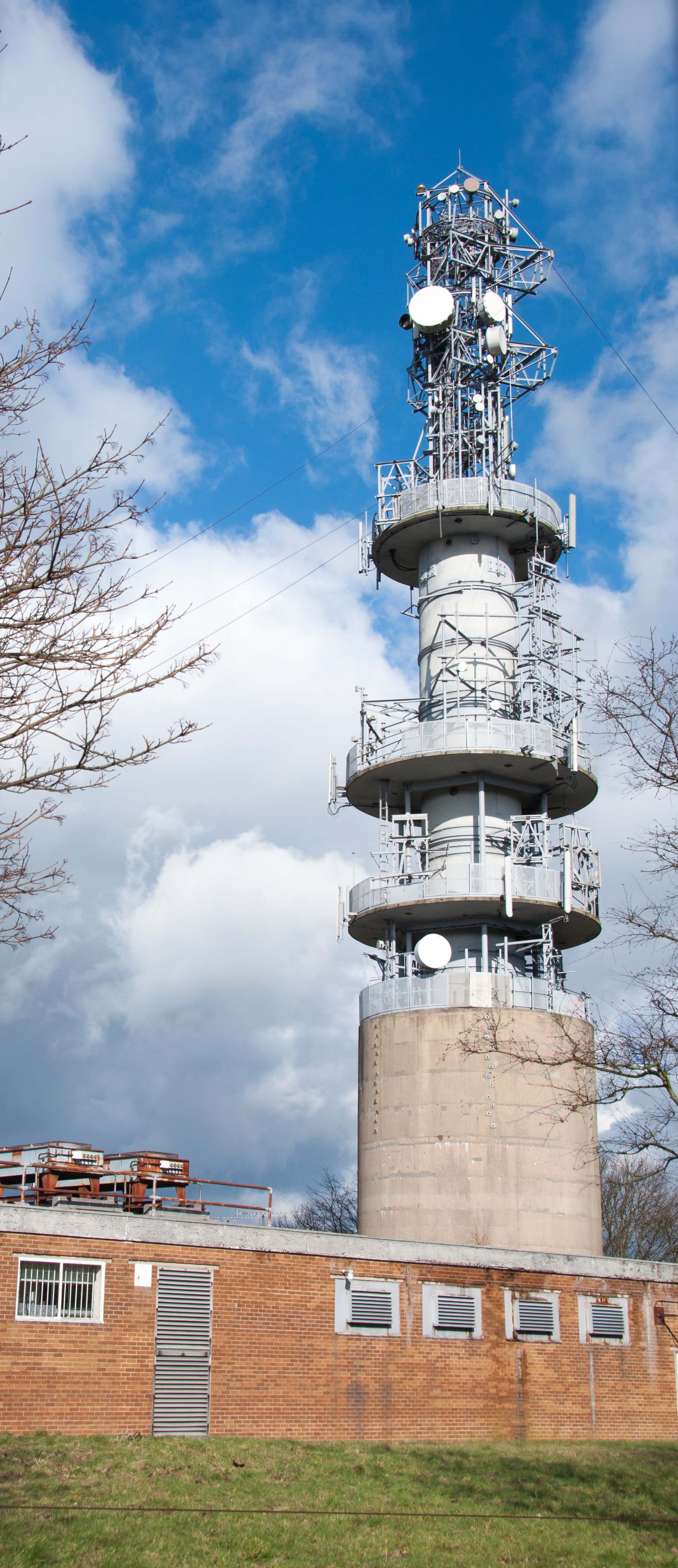
Tinshill BT Tower on 5 March 2016 with large dishes removed

The Tinshill BT Tower (also known locally as Cookridge Tower, or Tinshall BT Radio Station) is a 60.96 metres ( 200 ft) tall telecommunication tower located on the east side of Otley Old Road in the north of Leeds, West Yorkshire, England. It is in an elevated part of Leeds, with its base 192 metres above sea level. It is one of fourteen BT towers built of reinforced concrete.

The tower is 53 metres tall and consists of a steel lattice tower on top of a concrete base. It was built in 1951 as part of chain of stations relaying television between Telephone House in Manchester and Kirk O'Shotts in Scotland, part of the British Telecom microwave network.

In 2002 it had 16 large microwave dishes providing point-to-point communications, and roughly 50 other small microwave dishes, mobile phone, paging and TETRA transmitters. The BT dishes were 3 and 3.7 metres diameter and mostly transmitted on 11 GHz.

In 2002, prompted by a request from the local MP, Harold Best, it was the subject of a study by the Health Protection Agency, who concluded that the radio emissions from its various transmitters, were well below levels which might cause a risk to health for people nearby.

== See also ==
- Telecommunications towers in the United Kingdom
- Radio masts and towers
- List of towers
