= Heaton Park BT Tower =

Telecommunication tower in Manchester, England

Heaton Park
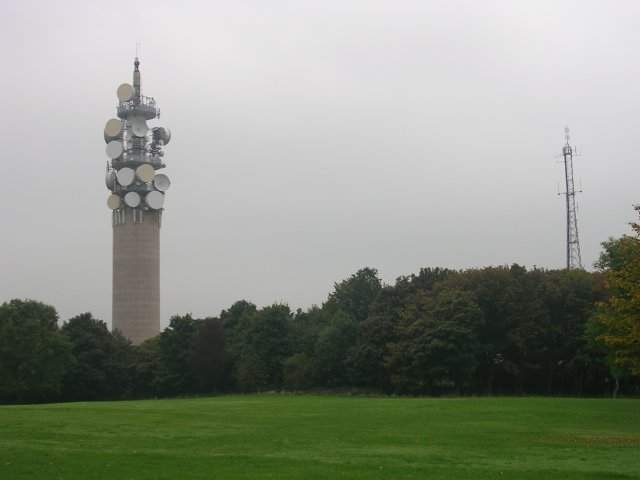
- Heaton Park BT Tower (left)

- Location within Greater Manchester
- Location: Heaton Park, Manchester, England
- Coordinates: 53°32′23″N 2°15′19″W
- Grid reference: SD8308804828
- Built: 1960s

The Heaton Park BT Tower is a 238-foot (73 m) tall concrete telecommunications tower located next to Heaton Park Reservoir in Manchester, England. Heaton Park BT Tower is one of the few British towers built of reinforced concrete, and one of seven BT towers of the 'Chilterns' design.

During the Cold War, the British government proposed a communications network that (it was hoped) would survive a nuclear attack. Radio stations (including the Heaton Park Tower) would maintain national and international communications before, during and after a nuclear emergency, transmitting microwave radio signals in a network known as Backbone. Spurs feeding into the network were provided at three locations: London, Manchester (Heaton Park Tower) and Birmingham. Whether or not the Backbone network plan was realised is classified, but HM Government denied in Parliament that the tower's function was secretive.

Beside the tower was a monitoring station (one of hundreds across the country) to record the blast and fallout in the event of a nuclear war. The station provided for three men from the Royal Observer Corps (ROC) to live underground whilst recording what was happening above ground in the event of a nuclear strike.

== See also ==
- British Telecom microwave network
- Telecommunications towers in the United Kingdom
