= Sutton Common BT Tower =

Radio tower near Macclesfield, Cheshire, England

Sutton Common
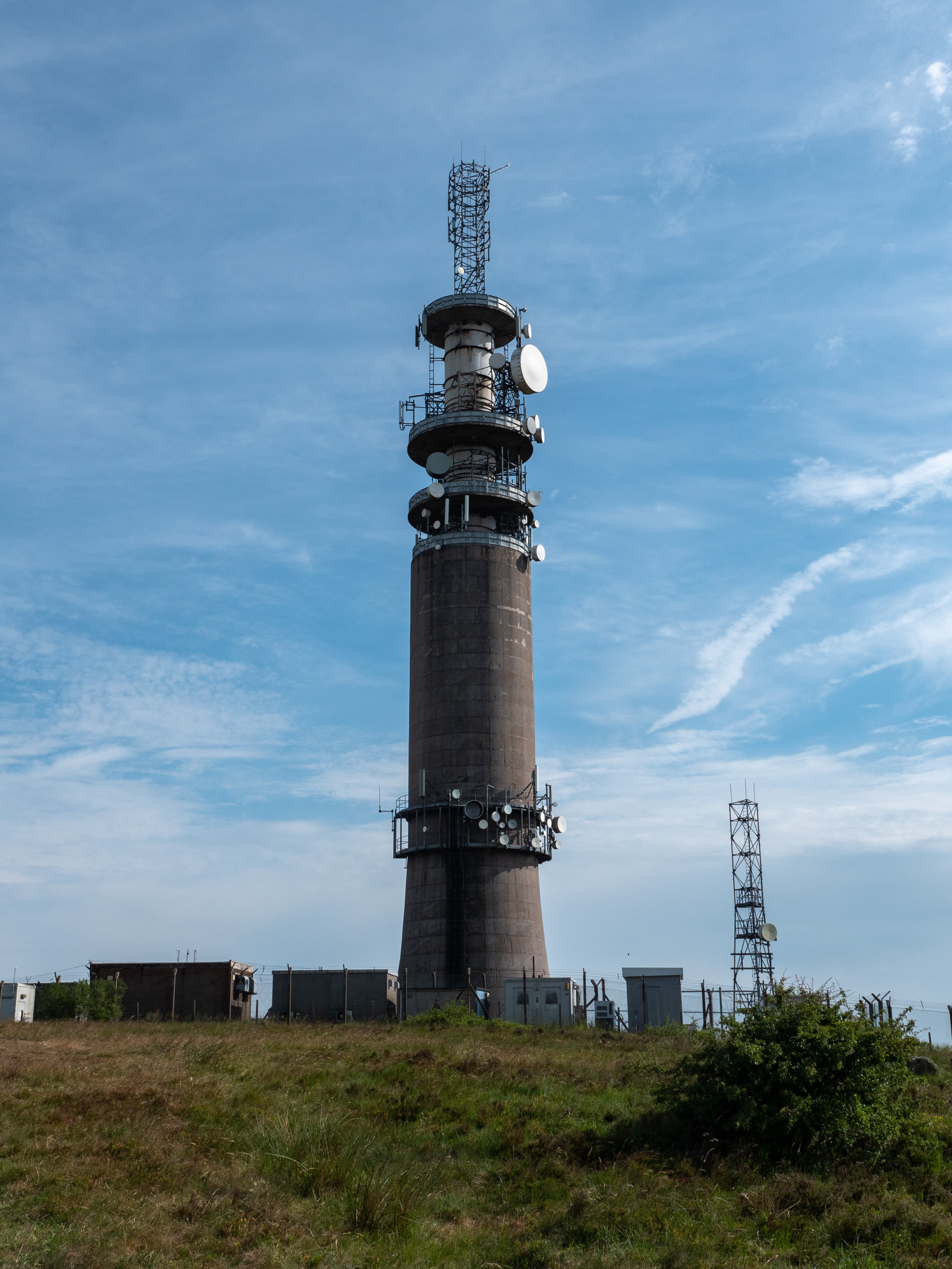
- Sutton Common BT Tower

- Location within Cheshire
- Location: Macclesfield, Cheshire
- Coordinates: 53.206129°N 2.100728°W
- Grid reference: SJ9327467710
- Built: 1960s

Sutton Common BT Tower is a 72-metre (238-foot) radio tower built of reinforced concrete at Macclesfield, Cheshire, England. Sutton Common was originally conceived as part of the 1950s 'Backbone' chain designed to provide the UK and NATO with survivable communications during nuclear war.

The tower stands near the summit of Croker Hill on the western edge of the Peak District national park. Sutton relays signals to Heaton Park in the north and Pye Green to the south. For survivability during a nuclear war, the Backbone towers are some of the few communication towers in the United Kingdom built of reinforced concrete.

A wind farm was proposed on land adjacent to the transmitter but was objected to for various reasons, including the possible effects of turbine blades on the fixed link.

== Channels available from this site ==
=== Analogue radio ===
Frequency	kW	Service
96.4 MHz	0.250	Greatest Hits Radio Staffordshire & Cheshire
106.9 MHz	0.300	Silk Radio

=== Digital radio ===
Frequency	Block	kW	Operator
220.352 MHz	12C	0.5	Manchester
229.072 MHz	12D	0.5	Stoke & Stafford

== See also ==
- British Telecom microwave network
- Telecommunications towers in the United Kingdom
- List of towers
