= Pye Green BT Tower =

Telecommunication tower in Staffordshire, England

Pye Green
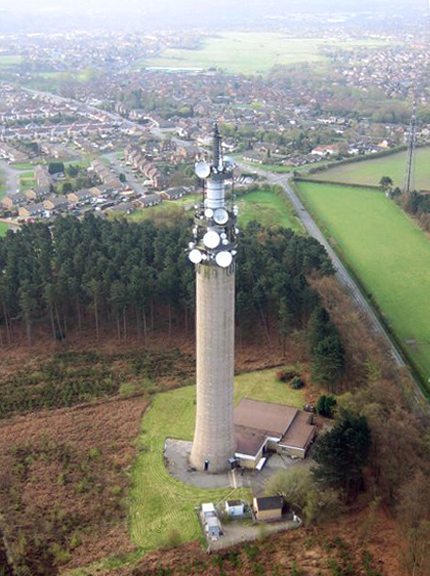
- Pye Green BT Tower, from a hot air balloon

- Location within Staffordshire
- Location: Pye Green, Staffordshire, England
- Tower height: 258 ft (79 m)
- Coordinates: 52.728655°N 2.019655°W
- Grid reference: SJ987142

Pye Green BT Tower is a 258-foot (79 m) tall telecommunication tower built of reinforced concrete at Pye Green, Staffordshire, England. Standing on the far southern edge of Cannock Chase, it is one of 14 telecommunication towers in the United Kingdom built of reinforced concrete. Pye Green was constructed as part of the Cold War British Telecom microwave network, also known as "Backbone".

Its combination of elevation and height give it line-of-sight to the BT Towers in Birmingham and Sutton Common in Cheshire.

== Services available ==
=== Analogue radio (FM VHF) ===
Frequency	kW	Service
96.9 MHz	0.2	Greatest Hits Radio Staffordshire & Cheshire

=== Digital radio (DAB) ===
Frequency	Block	kW	Operator
229.072 MHz	12D	0.85	Stoke & Stafford
225.648 MHz	12B	1.75	BBC National DAB

== See also ==
- Telecommunications towers in the United Kingdom
