= BT Tower =

Communications tower in London, England

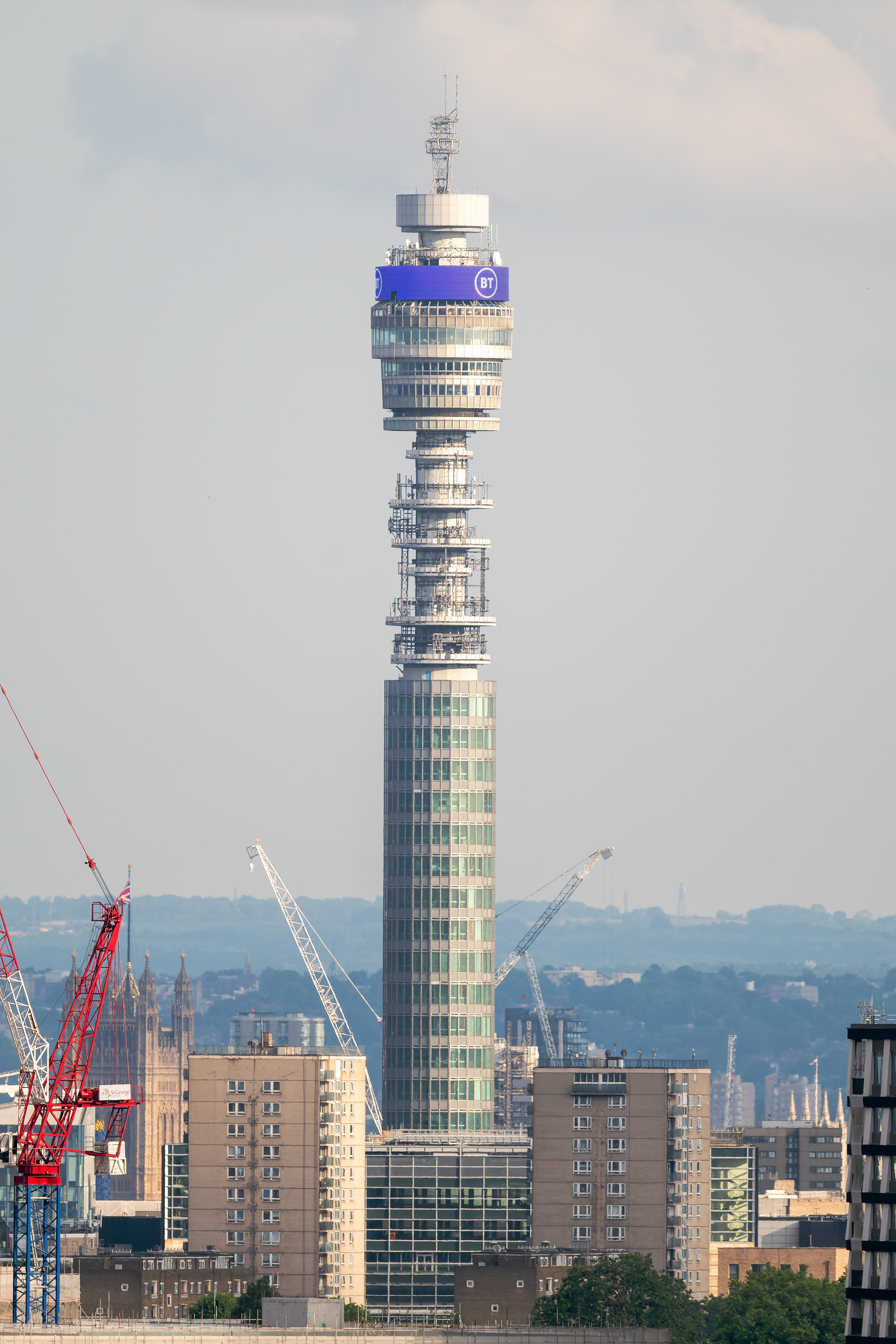
- BT Tower in 2025

Record height
- Tallest in the United Kingdom from 1964 to 1980^{[I]}
- Preceded by: Millbank Tower
- Surpassed by: NatWest Tower

General information
- Type: Offices
- Location: London, W1T; United Kingdom
- Coordinates: 51.5215°N 0.1389°W
- Construction started: 1961
- Completed: 1964
- Owner: MCR Hotels

Height
- Antenna spire: 189 metres (620 ft)
- Roof: 177 metres (581 ft)

Technical details
- Floor count: 37
- Lifts/elevators: 2

Design and construction
- Architect: Eric Bedford
- Main contractor: Peter Lind & Company

The BT Tower is a communications tower in Fitzrovia, London, England, constructed in 1964. At the time of its completion it was known as the Museum Radio Tower, referring to its use by the neighbouring Museum Telephone Exchange. Subsequent changes in ownership caused it to become the Post Office Tower and Telecom Tower before it gained its current name in 1991. Since 2024 it has been owned by MCR Hotels. In 2003 Historic England designated it as a Grade II listed building.

The main structure is 177 metres (581 ft) high, with aerial rigging bringing the total height to 189 metres (620 ft). Upon completion it was the tallest structure in London and remained so until 1980. Butlins managed a revolving restaurant in the tower from 1966 until 1980. A 360° LED screen displays news across central London.

== History ==
=== Design and construction ===
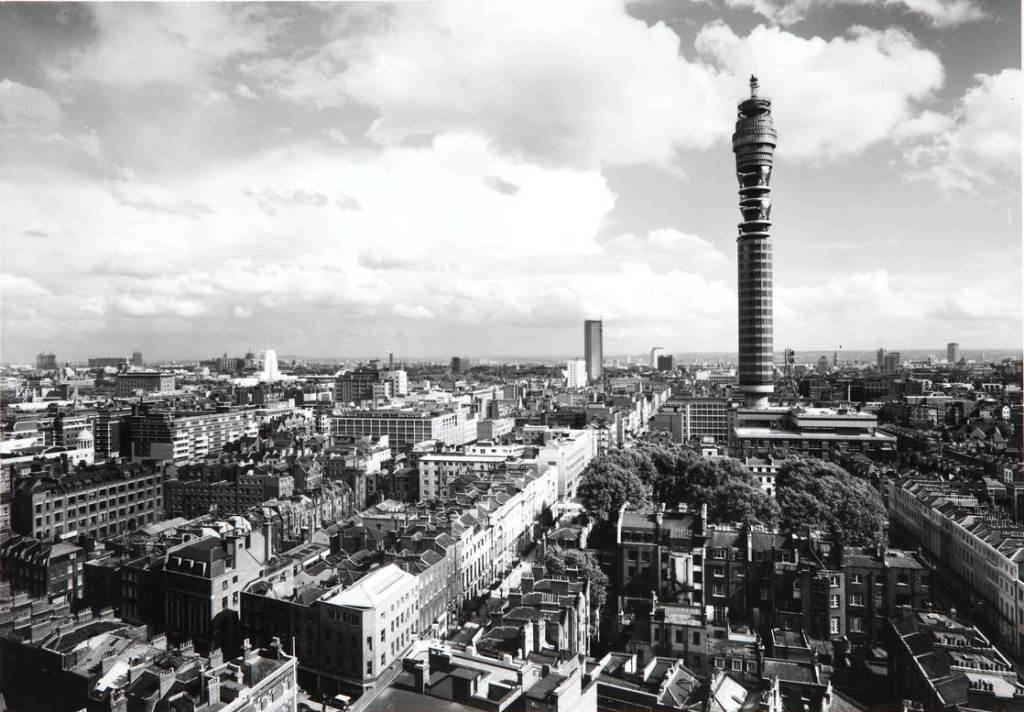
Post Office Tower during construction

The tower was commissioned by the General Post Office (GPO). Its primary purpose was to support the microwave aerials then used to carry telecommunications traffic from London to the rest of the country, as part of the GPO microwave network.

It replaced a shorter, 1940s steel lattice tower on the roof of the Museum Telephone Exchange, so named for its proximity to the British Museum. The taller structure was required to protect the radio links' line of sight against tall buildings then planned in London. Links were routed via GPO microwave stations Harrow Weald, Bagshot, Kelvedon Hatch and Fairseat, and locations including the London Air Traffic Control Centre.

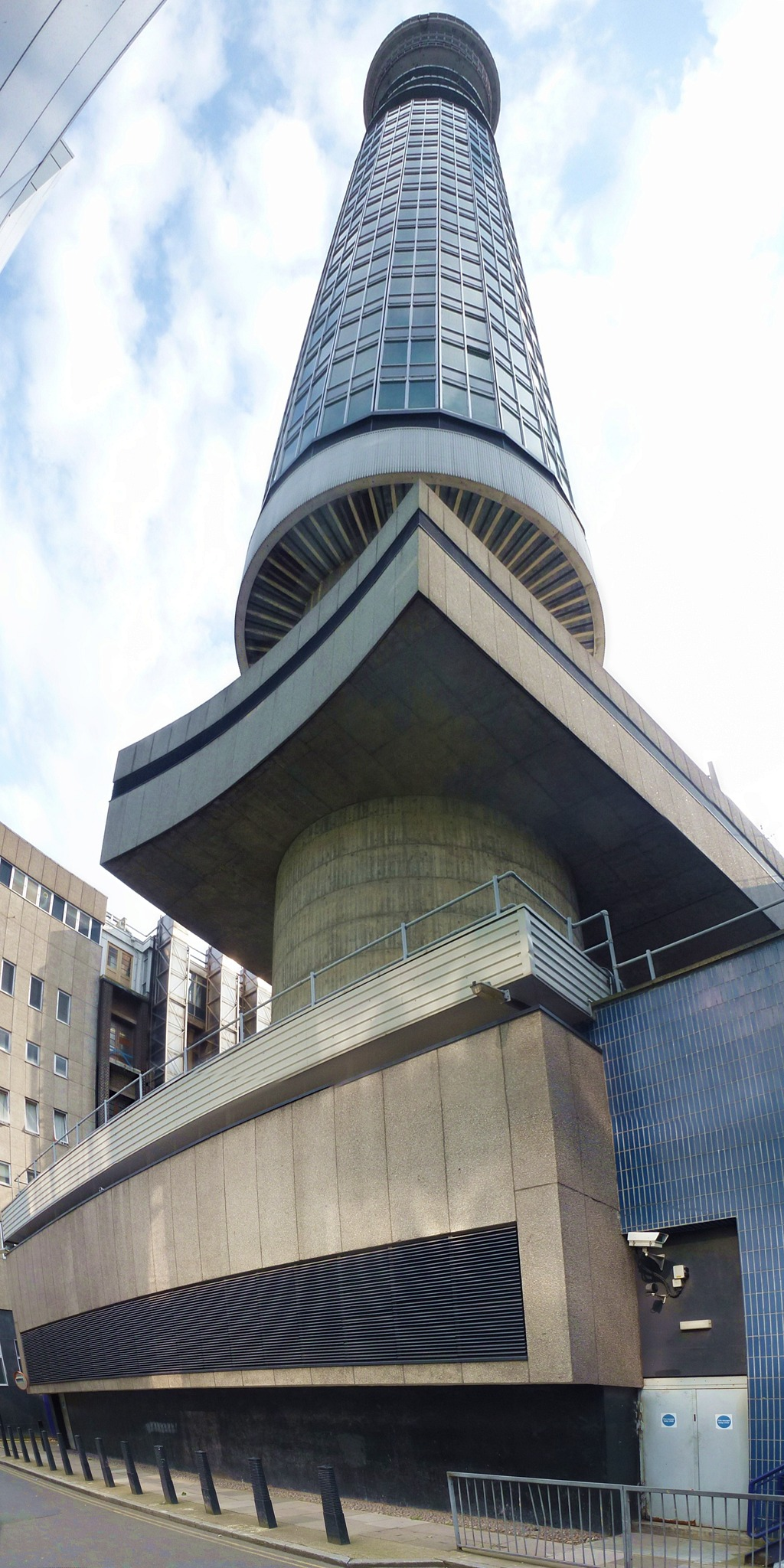
Wide-angle view of the tower and its base from Cleveland Mews in August 2012

The tower was designed by the Ministry of Public Building and Works, under chief architects Eric Bedford and G R Yeats. Typical for its time, the building is concrete clad in glass. The narrow cylindrical shape was chosen as a stable platform for microwave aerials. It shifts no more than 25 centimetres (10 in) in wind speeds of up to 150 km/h (95 mph). To prevent overheating, the glass cladding had to be tinted.

Construction began in June 1961; owing to the building's height and its having a tower crane jib across the top virtually throughout the whole construction period, it gradually became a very prominent landmark that could be seen from almost anywhere in London. A question was raised in Parliament in August 1963 about the crane. Reginald Bennett MP asked the Minister of Public Buildings and Works, Geoffrey Rippon, how, when the crane on the top of the new Tower had fulfilled its purpose, he proposed to remove it. Rippon replied: "This is a matter for the contractors. The problem does not have to be solved for about a year but there appears to be no danger of the crane having to be left in situ." Construction reached 475 ft by August 1963. The revolving restaurant was prefabricated by Ransomes & Rapier and the lattice tower by Stewarts & Lloyds subsidiary Tubewrights.

The tower was topped out on 15 July 1964, by Geoffrey Rippon and inaugurated by Prime Minister Harold Wilson on 8 October 1965. The main contractor was Peter Lind & Company.

The tower was originally designed to be just 111 metres (364 ft) high; its foundations are sunk down through 53 metres (174 ft) of London clay, and are formed of a concrete raft 27 metres (89 ft) square, 1 metre (3 ft) thick, reinforced with six layers of cables, on top of which sits a reinforced concrete pyramid.

Initially, the first 16 floors were for technical equipment and power. Above that was a 35-metre (115 ft) section for the microwave aerials, then six floors of suites, a revolving restaurant, kitchens, technical equipment, and finally a cantilevered steel lattice tower. The construction cost was £2.5 million.

The first microwave link was to Norwich on 1 January 1965. The Met Office put a weather radar on top of the tower. Much of the telecommunications equipment was made by GEC. The stainless steel clad windows were made by Henry Hope & Sons Ltd.

=== Opening ===
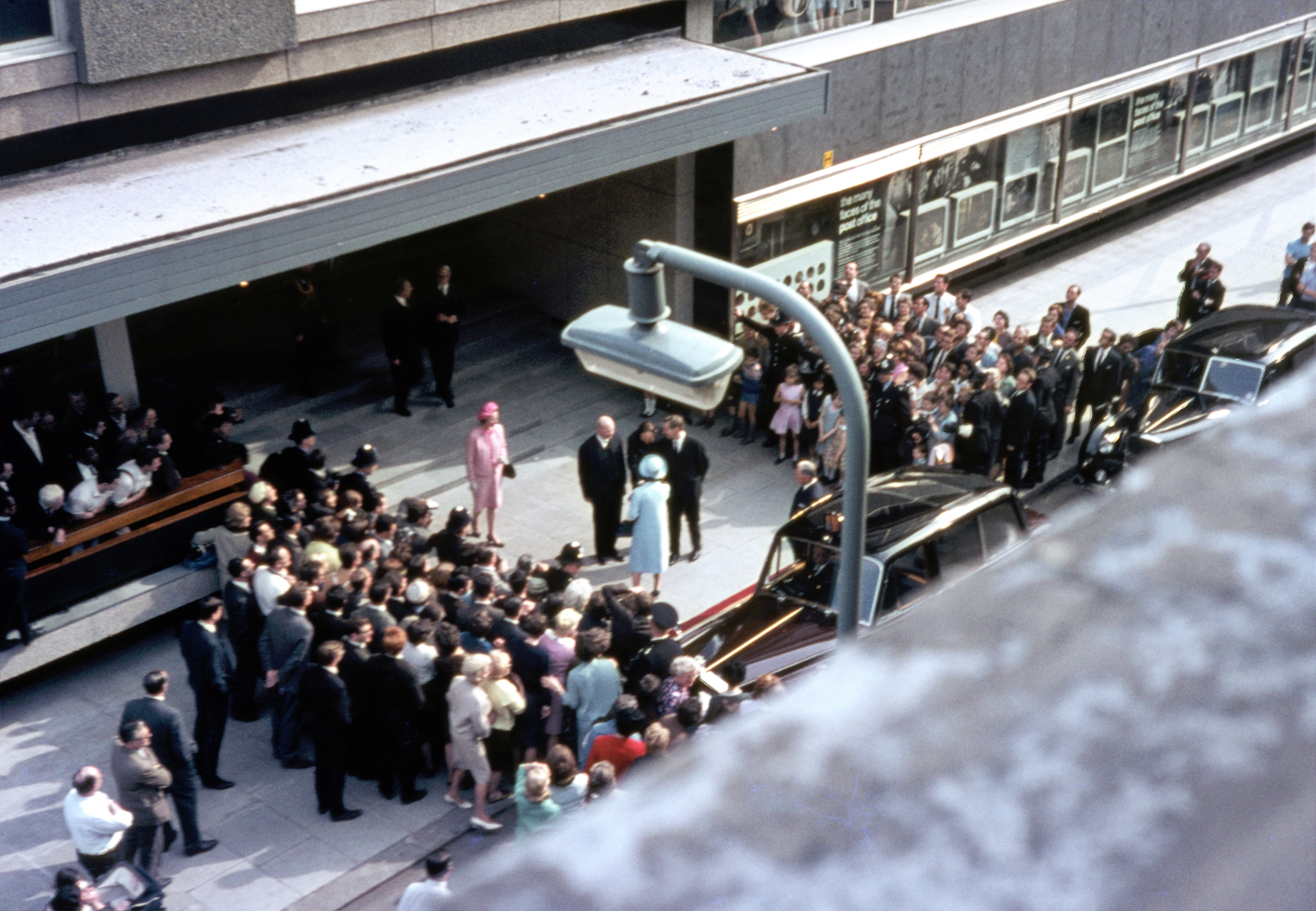
Queen Elizabeth II visiting the tower in May 1966

The tower was opened to the public on 19 May 1966, by Postmaster General, Anthony Wedgwood Benn and Billy Butlin, with HM Queen Elizabeth II having visited on 17 May 1966.

As well as communications equipment and office space, there were viewing galleries and a souvenir shop. Butlins' Top of the Tower revolving restaurant on the 34th floor made one revolution every 23 minutes and meals cost about £4 (equivalent to £70 in 2025).

In the first year there were nearly one million visitors, and over 100,000 diners.

=== Bombing ===
A bomb exploded in the ceiling of the men's toilets at the Top of the Tower restaurant at 04:30 on 31 October 1971; the blast damaged buildings and cars up to 400 yards (370 m) away. Responsibility for the bomb was claimed by members of the Angry Brigade, a far-left anarchist collective. A call was also made by a person claiming to be the Kilburn Battalion of the IRA.

The tower was closed to visiting by the general public following the 1971 bombing, but the restaurant reopened. In 1980, Butlins' restaurant lease expired.

The tower has been used for events including a children's Christmas party and Children in Need 2010. It retains the revolving floor.

=== Recent ===
The tower's microwave aerials remained in use into the 21st century, connected to subterranean optical fibre links.

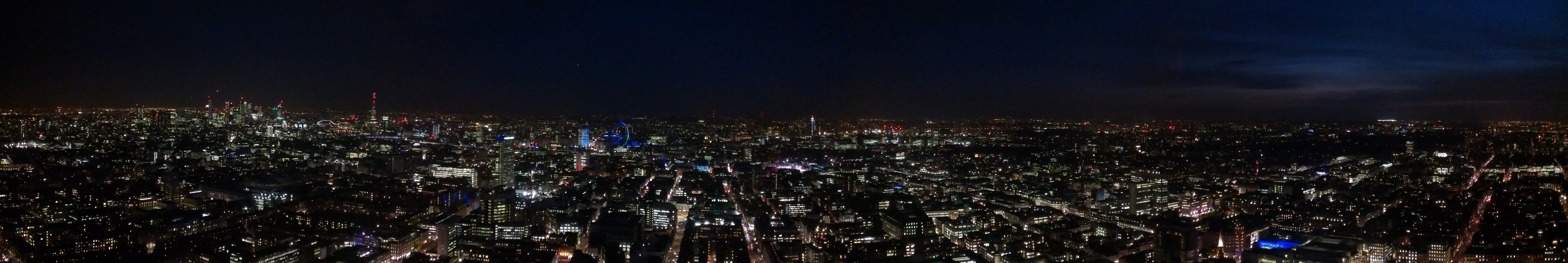
Panoramic view from BT Tower in the evening, 2014.

In 2009, a 360° coloured screen was installed 167 m (548 ft) up, over the 36 and 37th floors of the tower. It replaced an earlier light projection system and incorporated 529,750 LEDs arranged in 177 vertical strips around the tower. It was then the largest of its type in the world, occupying an area of 280 m^{2} (3,000 sq ft) and with a circumference of 59 m (194 ft). It displayed a countdown of the number of days until the start of the 2012 Summer Olympics.

In April 2019, the screen broadcast a Windows 7 error message for almost a day.

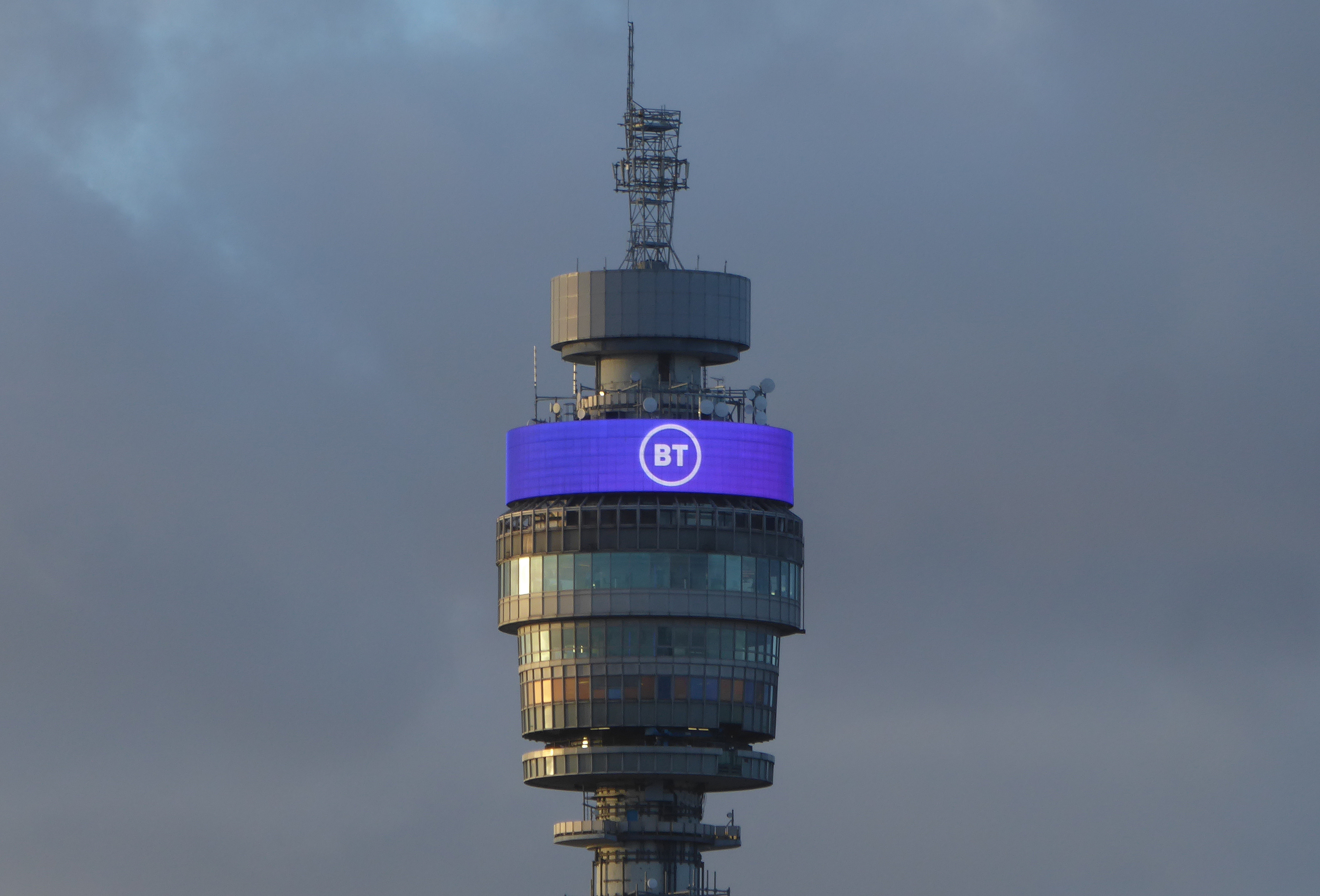
The tower's LED screen

In October 2009, The Times reported that the revolving restaurant would be reopened in time for the 2012 London Olympics. However, in December 2010, it was noted those plans had been "quietly dropped".

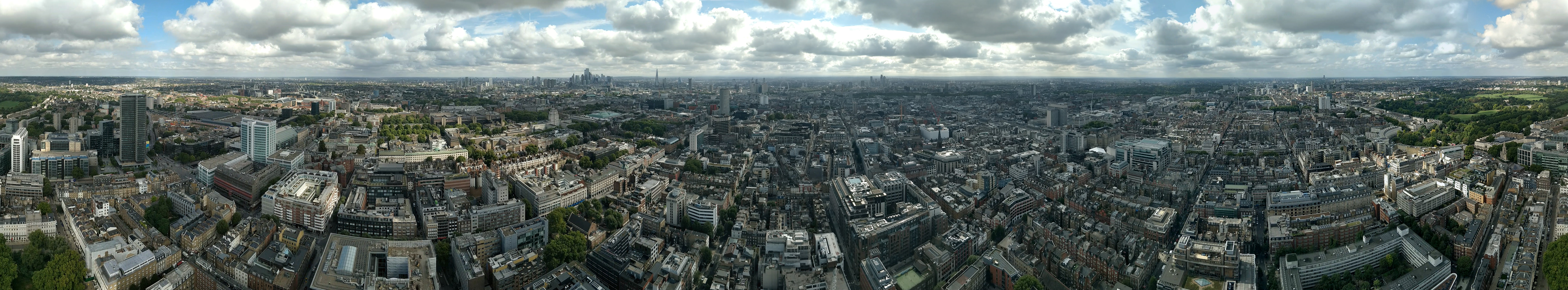
360° panoramic view from the revolving restaurant in September 2022

For the tower's 50th anniversary, the 34th floor was opened for three days from 3 to 5 October 2015 to 2,400 winners of a lottery.

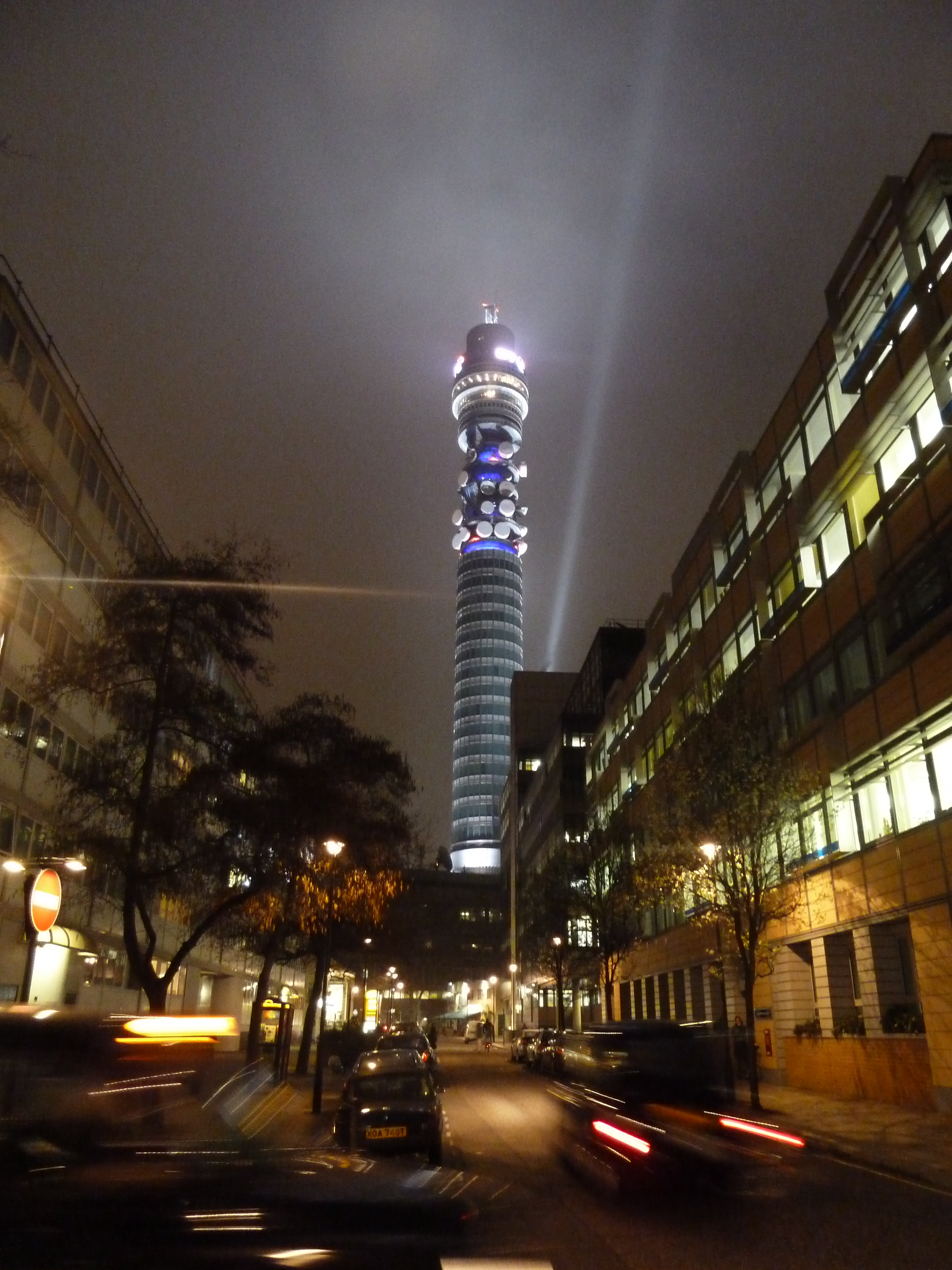
BT Tower at night, 2011

The BT Tower was given Grade II listed building status in 2003. Several of the defunct antennae attached to the building were protected by this listing, meaning they could not be removed unless the appropriate listed building consent was granted. Permission for their removal was given in 2011 on safety grounds, as they were in a bad state of repair and the fixings were no longer secure. The last of the antennae was removed in December 2011, leaving the core of the tower visible.

Entry to the building is by two high-speed lifts, which travel at a top speed of 1400 feet per minute (7 metres per second (15.7 mph)) and reach the top of the building in under 30 seconds. The original equipment was installed by the Express Lift Company, but it has since been replaced by elevators manufactured by ThyssenKrupp. Due to the confined space in the tower's core, removing the motors of the old lifts involved creating an access hole in the cast iron shaft wall, and then cutting the 3-ton winch machines into pieces and bringing them down in one of the functioning lifts. In the 1960s an Act of Parliament was passed to vary fire regulations, allowing the building to be evacuated by using the lifts – unlike other buildings of the time.

BT Tower Observatory

In 2006, the tower began to be used for short-term air-quality observations by the UK Centre for Ecology & Hydrology and this has continued in a more permanent form as BT Tower Observatory, an urban atmospheric pollution observatory to help monitor air quality and greenhouse gases in the capital. The aim is to measure pollutant levels above ground level to determine their source. One area of investigation is the long-range transport of fine particles from outside the city.

The National Centre for Atmospheric Science make NOx concentration and flux measurements from the BT Tower Observatory, recently quantifying the impacts of the ULEZ on air quality. In the 1-3 km area surrounding the BT Tower NOx pollution from gas boilers wa shown to be a larger source of pollution than from road transport.

=== Hotel ===
On 21 February 2024, BT Group announced the sale of BT Tower to MCR Hotels, who plan to retain the tower as a hotel.

== In popular culture ==
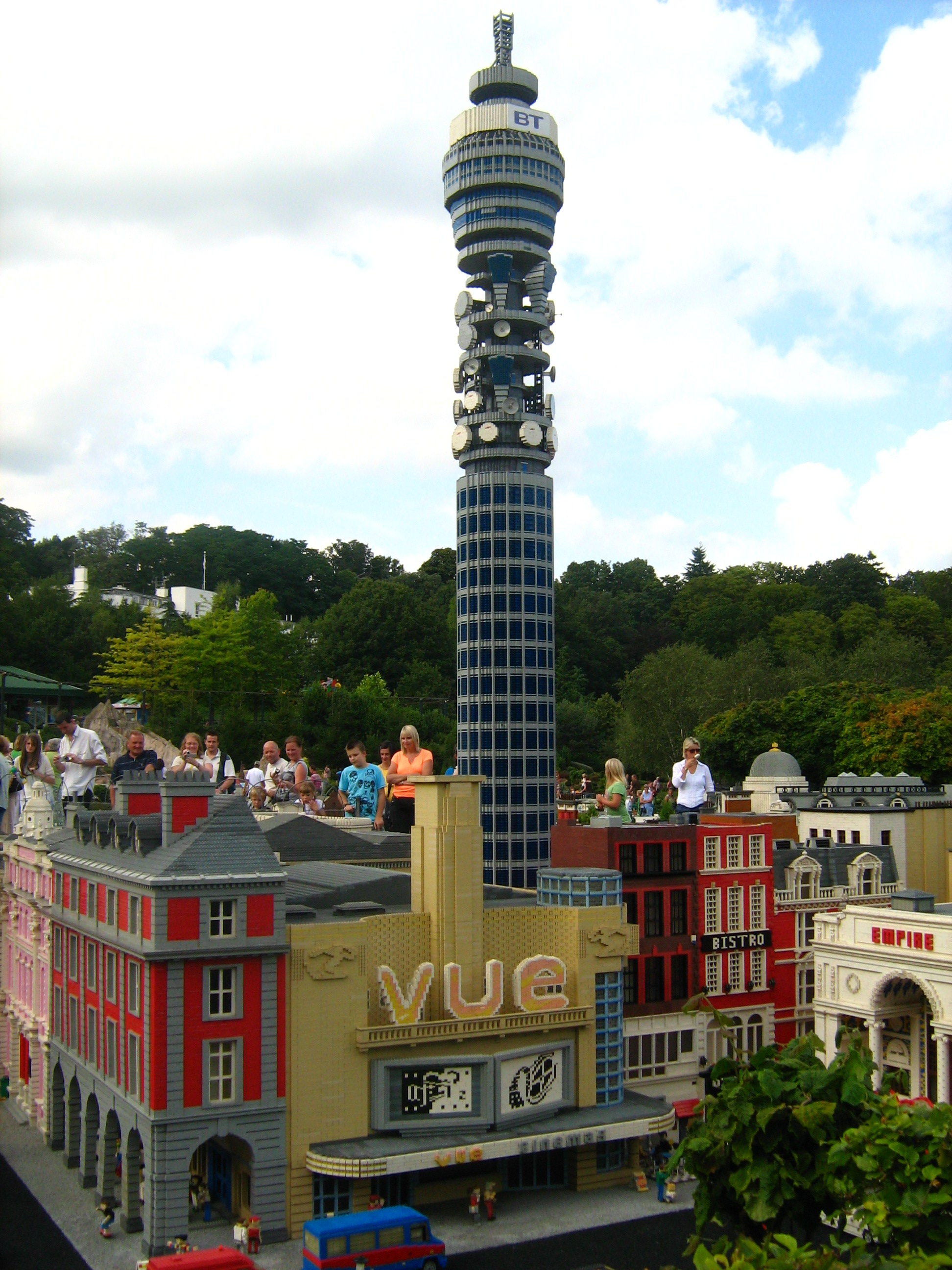
Model of BT Tower in Legoland Windsor

The tower has appeared in novels, films and on television, including Smashing Time, The Bourne Ultimatum, Space Patrol, Doctor Who, V for Vendetta, 28 Days Later, 28 Weeks Later, The Union and Danger Mouse. It is toppled by a giant kitten in The Goodies 1971 King Kong parody Kitten Kong.

It was referenced by the Dudley Moore Trio's track "GPO Tower" used in the soundtrack for Bedazzled in which it also appeared, as well as Cressida's track "Goodbye Post Office Tower Goodbye", released on the Asylum album in 1971. The tower is mentioned in The Jam's song "Life from a Window," on their 1977 album This Is the Modern World.

The tower also featured in the onscreen brand identify of Thames Television (London's weekday ITV service) alongside other major landmarks including Big Ben, Tower Bridge and St. Pauls Cathedral (the final iteration airing between 1990 - 1992 prior to the stations closure). The tower was also mentioned in Harry Potter and the Chamber of Secrets, as in the Evening Prophet was written Weasley's turquoise Ford Angelina have been seen over the Post Office tower.

The Post Office issued two commemorative postage stamps depicting the tower, designed by Clive Abbott (1933–2008) in 1965, the 3d value in blue with the Tower between Georgian buildings, and the 1s 3d value in green with the tower above Nash Terrace, Regents Park.

=== Races ===
The first documented race up the tower's stairs was on 18 April 1968, between University College London and Edinburgh University; it was won by an Edinburgh runner in 4 minutes, 46 seconds.

In 1969, eight university teams competed. John Pearson from Victoria University of Manchester was fastest in 5 minutes, 6 seconds.

In May 1969, the tops of the GPO Tower and the Empire State Building in New York City served as the start and finish lines of the Daily Mail Trans-Atlantic Air Race. The race between the two buildings was held over an eight-day period and commemorated the 50th anniversary of the first non-stop transatlantic flight of Alcock and Brown. A total of 21 prizes were offered to entrants for categories based on the type of aircraft they utilised and their direction of travel.

== Secrecy ==
A flyer distributed in advance of a demonstration on 1 May 1978 in support of the defendants in the ABC trial

The tower was built for government communication purposes (Backbone microwave relay network). Information about the tower was designated an official secret, and in 1978, journalist Duncan Campbell was tried for collecting information about such locations. The judge ordered the tower could only be referred to as "Location 23".

An urban legend says that the tower was omitted from Ordnance Survey map of London until the 1990s, despite being a 177-metre (581 ft) tall structure in the middle of central London that had once been open to the public. MP Kate Hoey referenced the story in Parliament in 1993 as an example of "seemingly trivial information that remains officially secret", using parliamentary privilege to state that "the British Telecom tower does exist and that its address is 60 Cleveland Street, London". However, the tower can be found on OS maps from before that time. Declassification was after the Tower was closed to the public.

== Gallery ==
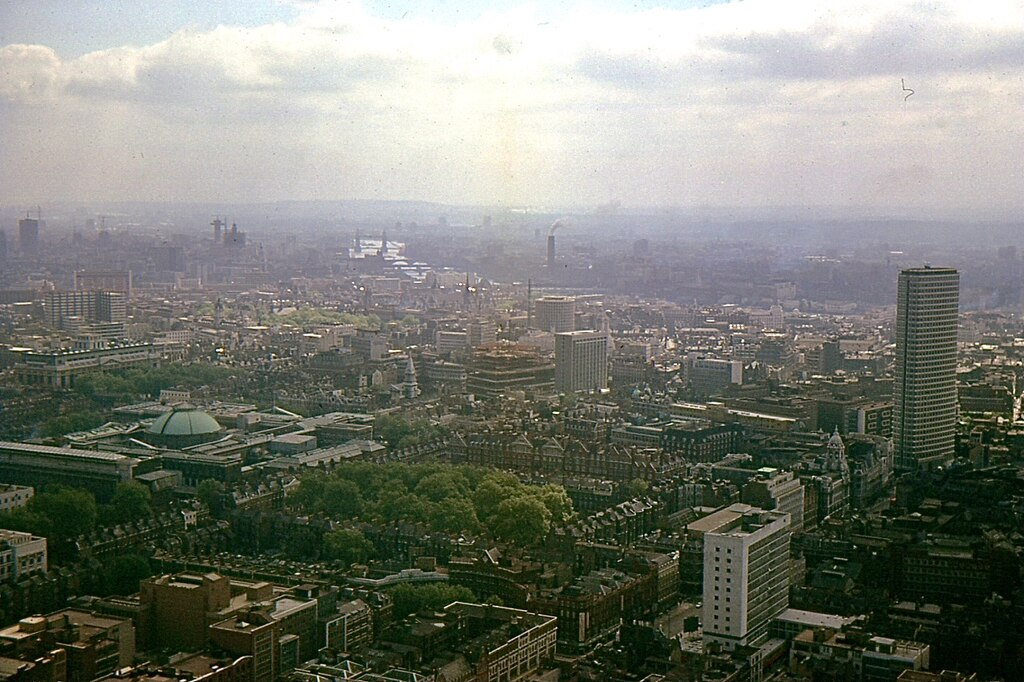
View of the British Museum and the River Thames from the Post Office Tower, 1966

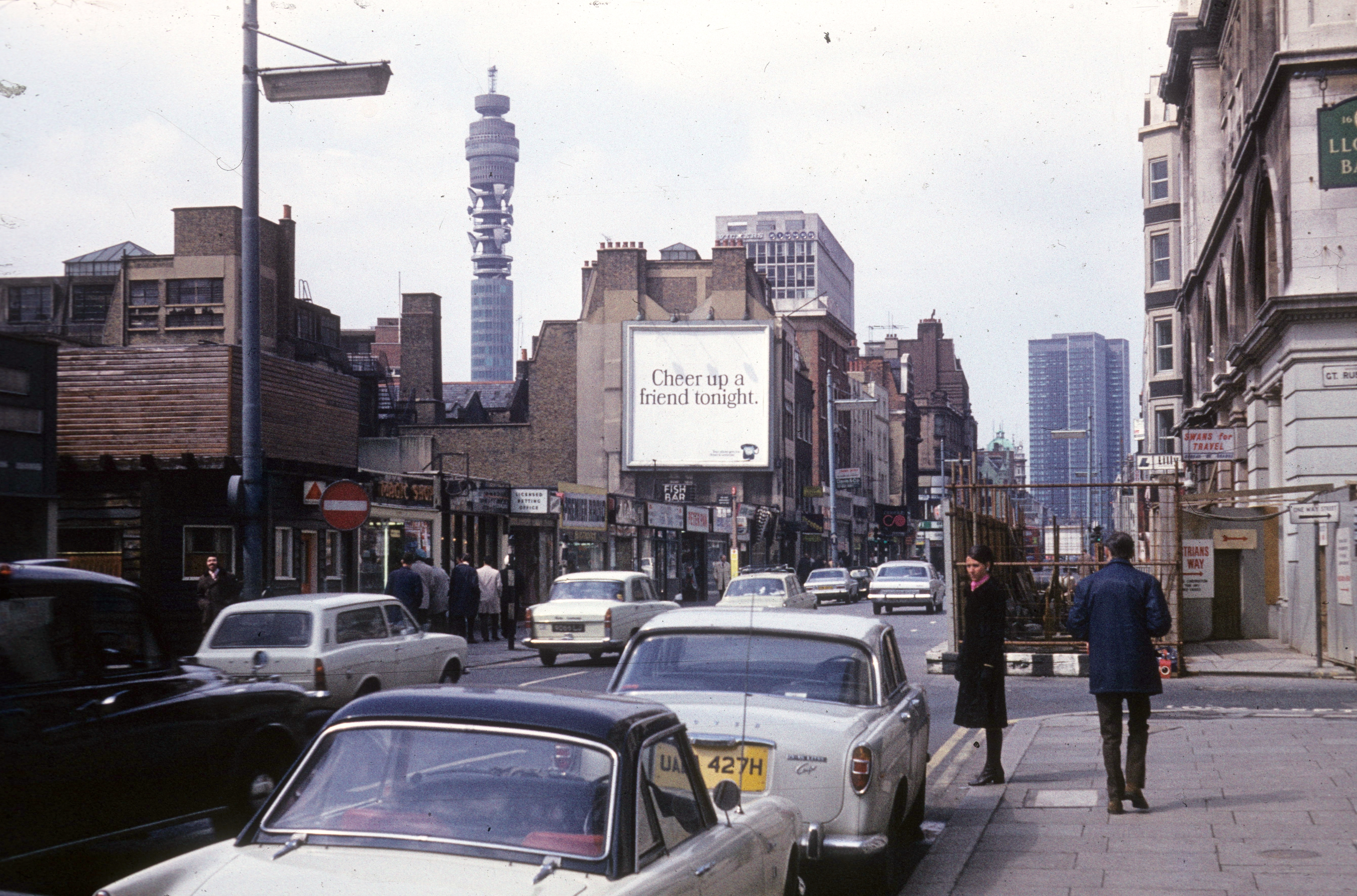
Post Office Tower in 1970

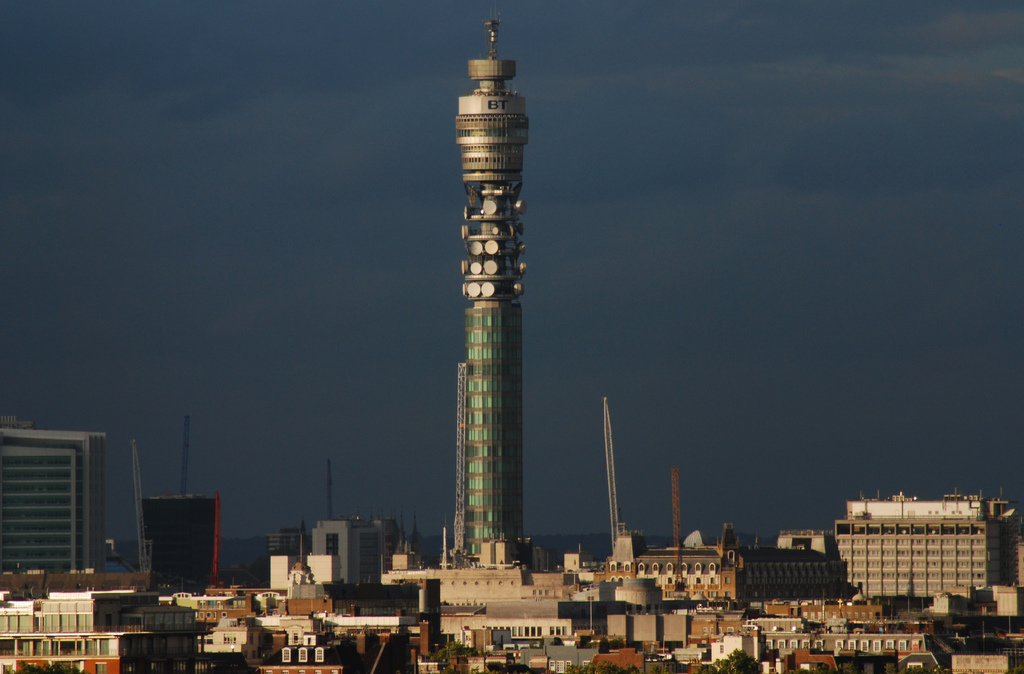
BT Tower from Queen's Tower, 2007

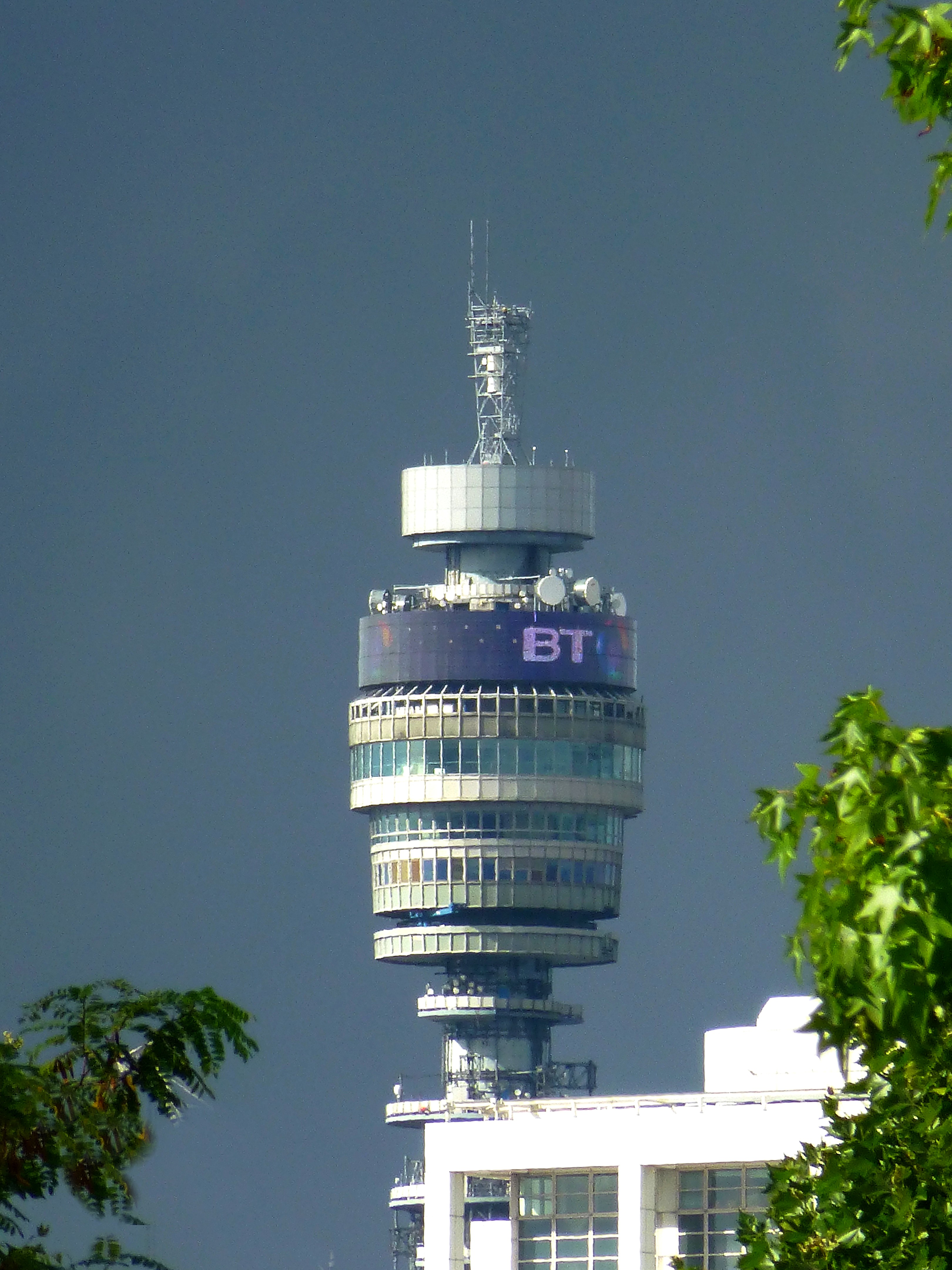
Top of BT Tower from the London Eye

== See also ==
- List of masts
- List of tallest buildings and structures in Great Britain
- List of towers
- List of tallest buildings and structures in London
- Telecommunications towers in the UK

Records
| Preceded by Millbank Tower | Tallest Building in the United Kingdom; 1967–1980; 177 m | Succeeded by NatWest Tower |
| Preceded by Millbank Tower | Tallest Building in London; 1967–1980; 177 m | Succeeded by NatWest Tower |
