= Kirk o' Shotts transmitting station =

Transmitter station in North Lanarkshire, Scotland

Kirk o' Shotts
- Location within North Lanarkshire
- Location: Salsburgh, North Lanarkshire
- Mast height: 183 metres (600 ft)
- Coordinates: 55.852778°N 3.826111°W
- Grid reference: NS8569563679
- Built: 1952
- BBC region: BBC Scotland (1952–1985)

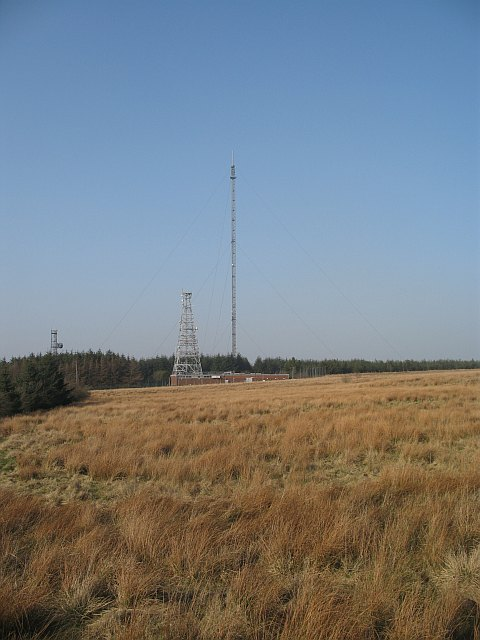
Kirk o' Shotts Radio Transmitting Station

The Kirk o' Shotts transmitting station is a broadcasting and telecommunications site at The Hirst which lies just outside the village of Salsburgh which is near the town of Shotts in North Lanarkshire central Scotland. (Kirk o' Shotts means 'Church of Shotts' and takes its name from nearby Kirk o' Shotts Parish Church and Kirk o' Shotts Primary School both located as you enter the nearby village of Salsburgh.)

== History ==
=== Construction ===
It was built by BICC.

=== Transmission ===
The BBC 405-line television service in Scotland started from Kirk o' Shotts on 14 March 1952 using low power reserve transmitters (Marconi). Full service began on 17 August 1952 using the main high power transmitters (Vision EMI Type 5704, Sound STC Type CTS-12). The station provided a service to a potential 4.1 million viewers and operated on Channel 3 (Vision 56.75 MHz, Sound 53.25 MHz) and transmissions were vertically polarised.

It subsequently became the main national FM transmitting station for the area, although that role is now filled by the nearby site at Black Hill.

Three DAB multiplexes are broadcast from the site: BBC (12B), Digital One (12A) and Switch Scotland (11D).

It has a 183 metres (600 ft) tall guyed mast, built in 1952. The mast was originally 228.6 metres (750 ft) tall.

The station is owned by Arqiva.

== Services available ==
=== Digital radio ===
Frequency	Block	kW	Operator
222.064 MHz	11D	1.88	Switch Scotland
223.936 MHz	12A	4.6	Digital One
225.648 MHz	12B	10	BBC National DAB

=== Analogue television ===
VHF analogue television was transmitted from Kirk o' Shotts from its launch in 1952 until the nationwide shutdown of 405 line VHF signals in 1985.

Frequency	VHF	kW	Service
56.75 MHz	3V	100	BBC One Scotland

== See also ==
- List of masts
- List of tallest structures in the United Kingdom
- Salsburgh
