= Donnington Grove =

Listed building in Berkshire, England

Coordinates: 51.41779°N 1.34207°W

- Location within Berkshire

General information
- Architectural style: Strawberry Hill Gothic
- Location: Donnington, Berkshire, England
- Year built: 1763
- Client: James Pettit Andrews

Website
- donnington-grove.com

Listed Building – Grade II*
- Official name: Donnington Grove
- Designated: 6 June 1952
- Reference no.: 1220450

Donnington Grove is a Strawberry Hill Gothic mansion, now a hotel and country club, and associated golf course at Donnington in the civil parish of Shaw-cum-Donnington, near Newbury, in the English county of Berkshire. It is overlooked by Donnington Castle.

== History ==
Donnington Grove was built in 1763 for James Pettit Andrews, the half-brother of the lord of Shaw Manor. The Grove was built in Strawberry Hill Gothic, a style named after the house created for Horace Walpole at Strawberry Hill in London. Records show that Donnington House was expensive to construct and costly to maintain. Twenty years later, Andrews sold the property to William Brummell who was responsible for turning Donnington Grove into the landscape it is today and here that his son, Beau Brummell, grew up. By the time Brummell died, the estate covered 800 acres (3.2 km^{2}), the house and stables had been extended and entrance lodges erected. William Brummell died in 1794 and left the estate to be divided amongst his children. After the estate was requisitioned by Allied Supplies in 1940 it was sold on to the Hon. Reginald Fellows, second husband of Daisy Fellowes, heiress to the Singer sewing machine fortune, and remained in the family until the early 1990s. Donnington Grove Country Club opened in 1993. For some years in the early 2000s, it was called 'Parasampia', but the name has returned to its traditional form.

== Donnington Grove Country Club ==
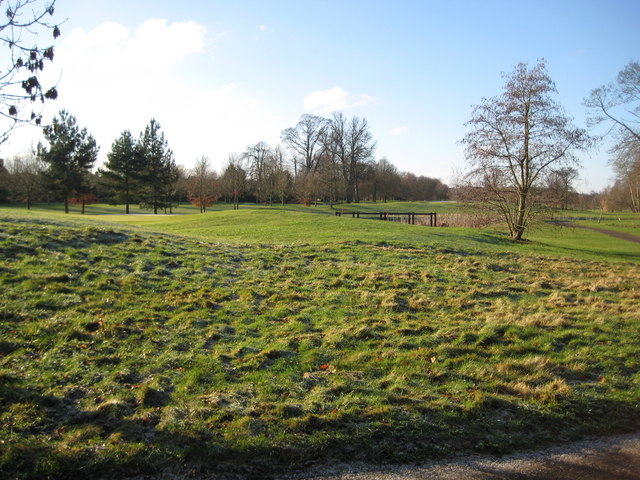
Golf course, site of the Second Battle of Newbury

The course opened in 1993 and the architect was Dave Thomas, the Ryder Cup player who was responsible for several courses such as the Brabazon Course at The Belfry and Bowood in Wiltshire. The course is well known for the change in character across its 18 holes: the front nine are on notably higher ground whilst the back nine are in classic parkland with an abundance of trees and water hazards.

== See also ==
- Grade II* listed buildings in Berkshire
