= Vodafone World Headquarters =

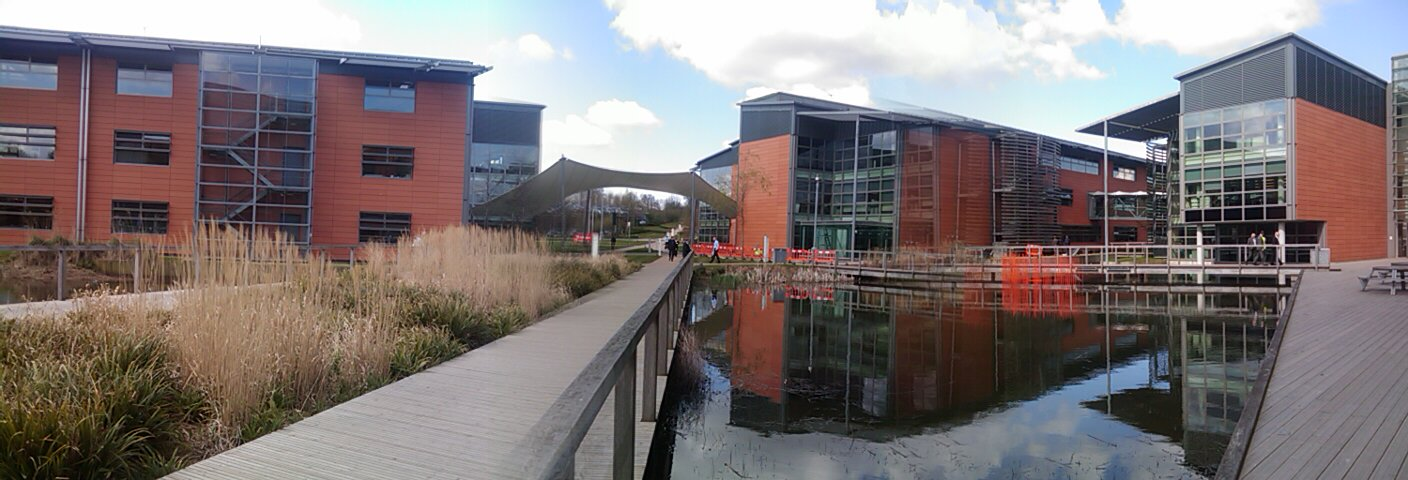
- Site in April 2008

- Location within Berkshire

General information
- Type: Telecommunications headquarters
- Location: Shaw-cum-Donnington, Berkshire, RG14 2FN
- Coordinates: 51.416°N 1.319°W
- Elevation: 80 m (262 ft)
- Current tenants: Vodafone
- Construction started: 2000
- Completed: 2003
- Client: Vodafone
- Owner: IQON Capital, Aljazira Capital

Dimensions
- Other dimensions: 30 acres

Technical details
- Structural system: Tensile fabric canopy
- Floor area: 51,600 sq metres

Design and construction
- Architecture firm: Fletcher Priest Architects
- Structural engineer: Buro Happold
- Services engineer: Cundall

The Vodafone World Headquarters is the main headquarters of British telecommunications company Vodafone within the UK.

== History ==
In 1999, Vodafone became the world's largest mobile telecommunications company, and the UK's third-largest public company.

Vodafone decided to move to the site in 1997. In April 1999, the local council was going to refuse outline planning permission for Vodafone to build its headquarters on the site as it was a greenfield development. But, the council planning committee decided on Tuesday 27 April 1999 not to refuse, as Vodafone had threatened to leave the area altogether, and the council wanted the 3,000 jobs and had acknowledged long-term financial generosity given to local sport clubs and charities by the company. The decision was passed by 10 Liberal Democrat councillors on West Berkshire Council voting with the Conservative group. The Liberal Democrats had asked Vodafone to include a £5m housing proposal, which Vodafone refused. The Liberal Democrat council leader resigned after the decision, but was later persuaded to stay. The land was owned by Genevieve Fairhurst, the wife of Conservative MEP Graham Mather. West Berkshire Council has been Conservative-controlled since 2006.

The site received full planning permission in early April 2000, and construction began soon after. At the time of opening, Vodafone was the largest mobile phone company in the world. The site would be called the Vodafone World Headquarters.

The site flooded on 20 July 2007.

The global headquarters was moved to One Kingdom Street in west London in October 2009, having been built in December 2008.

In January 2023 the entire site was sold to IQON Capital, on behalf of Aljazira Capital based in Saudi Arabia. Vodafone agreed to lease back four of the seven buildings on the site.

=== Construction ===
The £160m whole contract was awarded in mid-April 2000. The construction itself cost £80m.

There were seven buildings connected by tension fabric canopies, built by Architen of Chepstow. The seven buildings have around 9,000 square metres each.

=== Visits ===
Queen Elizabeth II and her husband Prince Philip visited the site on Friday 14 November 2008. She was shown how to access Facebook on a mobile phone and met Sir Ernest Harrison, who was the first person to make a call on a UK mobile network in 1985.

Prime Minister David Cameron visited the site at on Thursday 3 April 2014; he had been to Manchester and Birmingham on the same day.

== Structure ==
The site had around 3,000 staff, situated on the M4 corridor. There are seven cafes and a restaurant. There is an on-site full-time doctor.

Nearby to the south is Trinity School.

=== Research ===
All of Vodafone's telecommunications research for the UK takes place on the site. Vodafone have a digital hub in central London, employing 1000 staff.

=== Network Operations Centre ===
The NOC monitors the national and international demand on the Vodafone UK network. It has four full-time guides to show visitors around the NOC. A screen can show every text and voice call made across the Vodafone UK network.

== See also ==
- National Network Management Centre
- List of mobile network operators of Europe
