= Trinity School, Newbury =

Coordinates: 51.413°N 1.320°W

Trinity School

Location
- Love Lane; Shaw, Newbury, RG14 2DU; Berkshire

Information
- Type: Academy
- Motto: Personal Excellence and Collective Responsibility
- Established: 1999; 27 years ago
- Local authority: West Berkshire
- Department for Education URN: 138525 Tables
- Ofsted: Reports
- Chair of Governors: Sheila Loy
- Executive Headteacher: Charlotte Wilson
- Staff: 182
- Gender: Co-Educational (Mixed-Sex)
- Age: 11 to 18
- Enrolment: 1025
- Houses: Griffin Phoenix Dragon Pegasus
- Colour: Red Black Yellow
- Website: http://www.trinitynewbury.org

Trinity School is a co-educational secondary school with academy status in Newbury, Berkshire, England. The school opened in September 1999 when two existing schools (Turnpike School and Shaw House School) and one new school combined - hence the name Trinity. Trinity School caters for pupils between the ages of 11 and 19 and currently has approximately 1025 students on roll, including 108 in the Sixth Form.

== Description ==
Trinity School sits adjacent to Shaw House, a mansion completed in 1581. Shaw House originally formed part of the school however it is now managed by West Berkshire council and is used as a conference venue and public attraction.

Trinity School became an academy in May 2012 and in January 2013 was graded as 'Good' by Ofsted. In March 2013, Trinity sponsored Fir Tree Primary School and Nursery, forming the Newbury Academy Trust; a multi-academy trust of which Trinity is the lead school. Speenhamland Primary School joined the Newbury Academy Trust in February 2017. Charlotte Wilson is the Executive Headteacher of all three schools and CEO of the Newbury Academy Trust.

A £4 million sports complex was opened in October 2011; comprising sports hall, fitness club, gymnasium and an outdoor multi-use-games-area with areas for class based learning. In September 2014 a Sixth Form Centre was opened; based over three floors it includes study rooms equipped with IT facilities, a servery, an open-learning centre, silent-study area and an open-plan student lounge. on the 14th of September 2015, a new ASD Unit was opened, a 25 place local authority resource for students on the Autistic Spectrum. In May 2016, a new library was opened.

== Sixth form ==
Trinity School has a sixth form, which pupils from the school and the surrounding schools attend.

The sixth form centre is located in its own building, consisting of three floors. The centre contains a large, open-plan Common Room which is used as a socialising space, a Classroom, Three Study Rooms equipped with Computers, a Silent-Study Area and a Servery.

== Qualifications ==
=== Courses ===
The school offers GCSE and BTEC subjects, which students begin in Year 9 (aged 13–14). In Sixth Form, students are offered AS and A Levels, as well vocational qualifications including BTECs.

== School Units ==
=== ACE Unit ===
The school has an ACE unit which specialises in aiding pupils with dyslexia and learning difficulties.

=== ASD Unit ===
The school has an ASD unit. This resource caters for students who have an Education and Health Care Plan (EHCP) for Autism Spectrum Disorder and, without specialist intervention would struggle in a mainstream school. The unit opened in September 2015. It can accommodate up to 45 students.

=== Isolation Unit ===
The school uses an Isolation Unit. This is to keep students learning away from the Classroom when they're behaving disruptively and disturbing the rest of the class, hurting other students, attending an after-school detention or breaking the School Code. It can accommodate up to 50 children.

== Headteachers ==
Trinity School's past and present headteachers, since its establishment in 1999, are as follows:

| Years | Name |
|---|---|
Trinity Comprehensive School
| September 1999 to July 2003 | Rosemary Roscoe |
| September 2003 to December 2008 | Deborah Forster |
| January 2009 to February 2009 | Charlotte Wilson (Acting) |
| February 2009 to December 2011 | Paul Gerard Dick (Executive) Charlotte Wilson (Associate) |
| January 2012 to July 2012 | Paul Gerard Dick (Consultant Head) Charlotte Wilson (Headteacher) |
Trinity School (Newbury Academy Trust)
| September 2012 to July 2017 | Charlotte Wilson (Headteacher) |
| September 2017 to present | Charlotte Wilson (Executive) Brendan Hanlon (Associate) |
