= Shaw, Berkshire =

Village in Berkshire, England

Coordinates: 51°24′32″N 1°18′50″W

Shaw
- Village
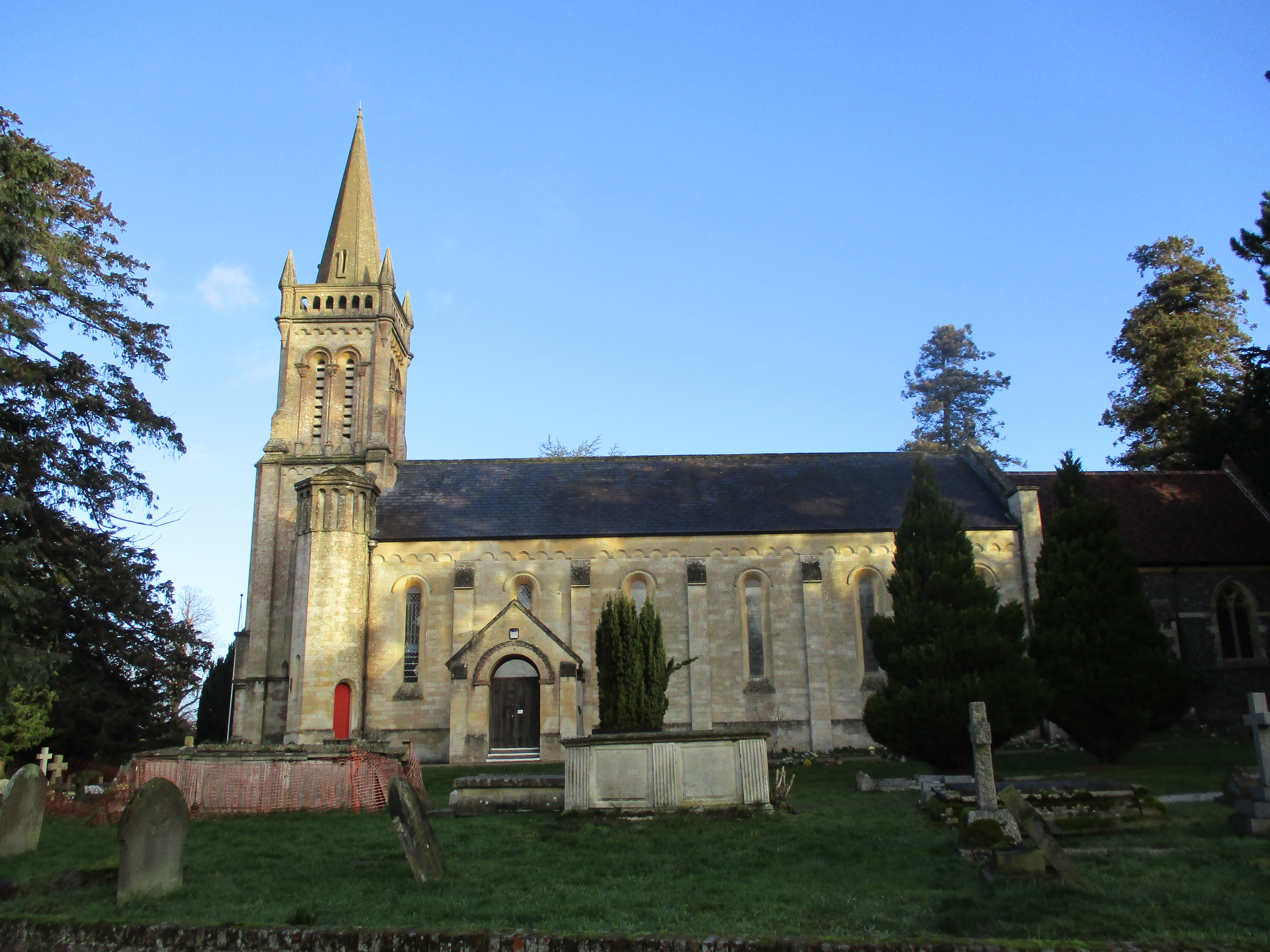
- St Mary's Church

- Location within Berkshire
- OS grid reference: SU 476 683
- Civil parish: Shaw-cum-Donnington
- Unitary authority: West Berkshire
- Ceremonial county: Berkshire
- Region: South East
- Country: England
- Sovereign state: United Kingdom
- Post town: Newbury
- Postcode district: RG14
- Dialling code: 01635
- Police: Thames Valley
- Fire: Royal Berkshire
- Ambulance: South Central
- UK Parliament: Newbury

Shaw is a village in Berkshire, England. It is located to the north of Newbury, on the River Lambourn near the village of Donnington. It is in the civil parish of Shaw-cum-Donnington. The parish church of St Mary is early Victorian, dating to 1842, and a grade II listed building. Shaw mill was a corn mill, now converted to apartments. The miller's house is also grade II listed.

== Shaw House ==
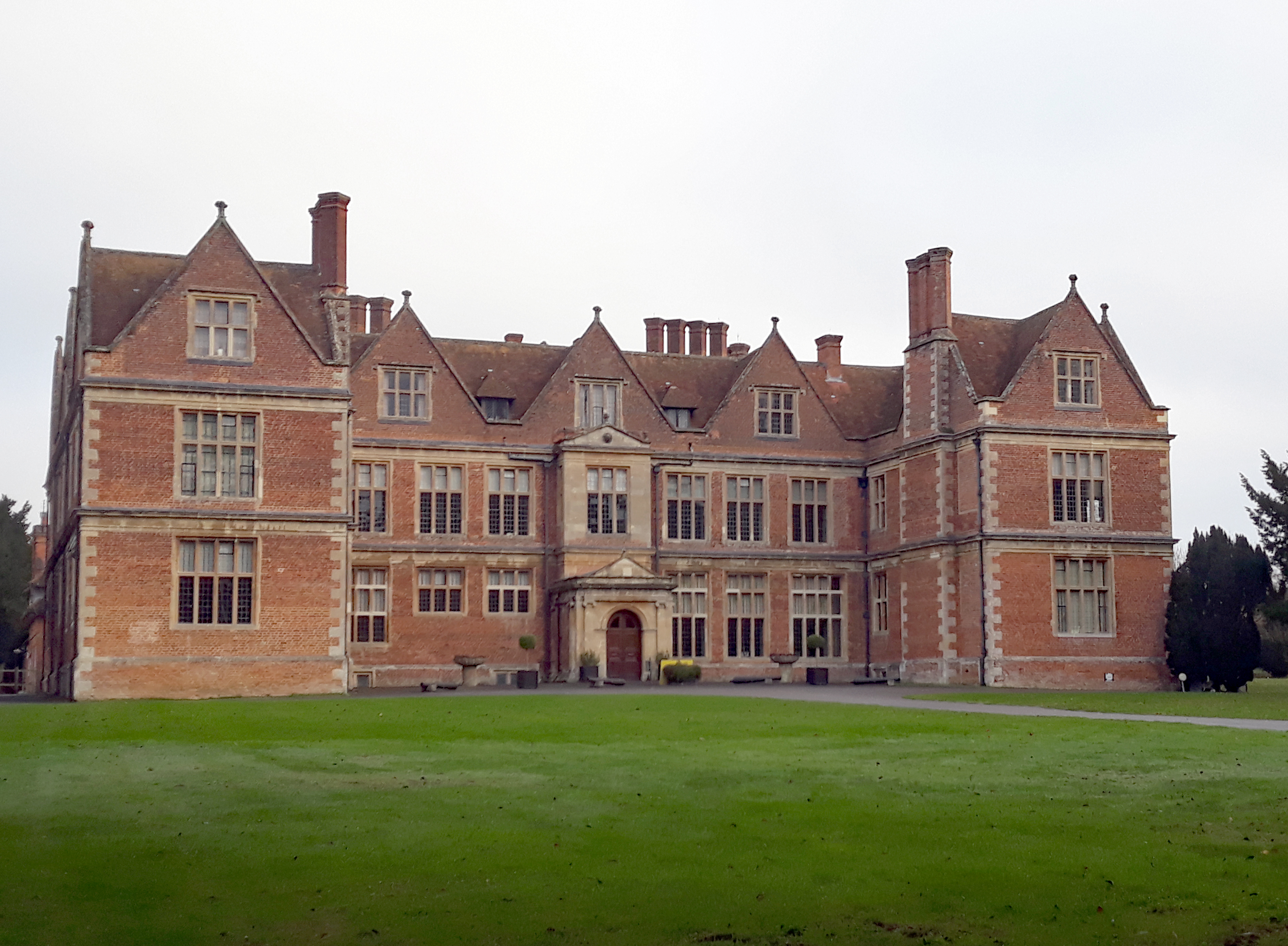
Shaw House

Shaw House, an Elizabethan country house, was one of the Royalist headquarters during the Second Battle of Newbury and, later, the childhood home of the historian, James Pettit Andrews. Having been a school for many years, it is now a conference centre owned by West Berkshire Council. The building is grade I listed. The park and gardens are grade II listed.

== Transport ==
From 18 February 2013, Shaw is served by Newbury & District bus services 6 and 6A from Newbury. The nearest railway station is Newbury.
