= Shaw House, Berkshire =

Historic house museum in Berkshire, England

Shaw House
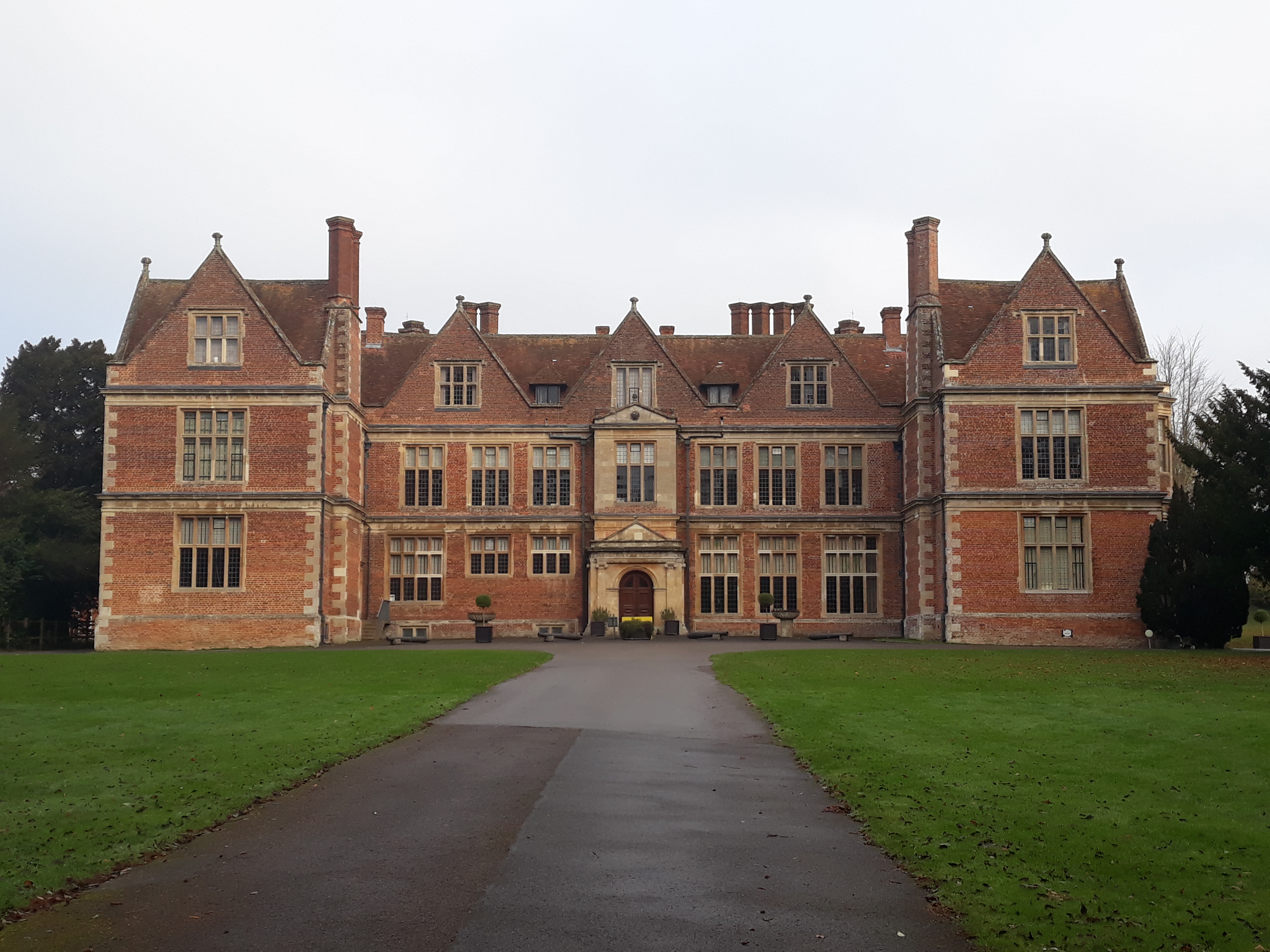
- South front of Shaw House

- Location within Berkshire
- 51°24′44″N 1°19′2″W
- Type: Mansion
- Location: Shaw cum Donnington
- OS grid reference: SU 47535 68238

History
- Built: 16th century

Site notes
- Area: 16 ha (40 acres)
- Architectural style: Elizabethan
- Owner: West Berkshire Council

Listed Building – Grade I
- Official name: Shaw House
- Designated: 6 June 1952
- Reference no.: 1220445

Listed Building – Grade II
- Official name: Shaw House Park and Garden
- Designated: 4 January 2000
- Reference no.: 1001446

Shaw House is an Elizabethan mansion in Shaw near Newbury, Berkshire, UK. The house is Grade I listed and its park and gardens are Grade II. The house is and early example of symmetrical H-plan architecture.

== History ==
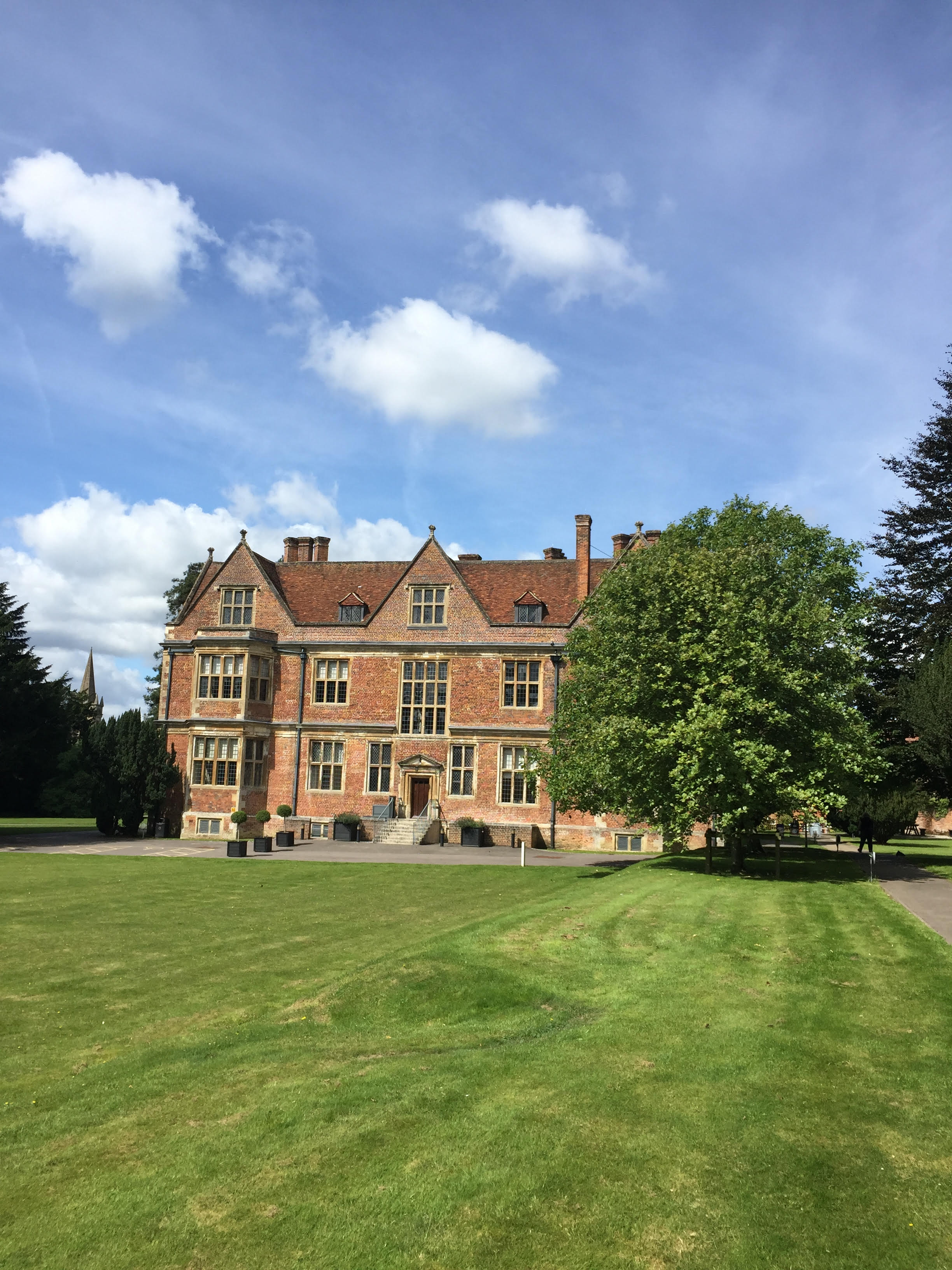
View of east side of the house

The manor house of Shaw, Shaw House was built by the wealthy cloth merchant, Thomas Dolman, and completed in 1581. It is famous for its reputation as King Charles I's headquarters during the Second Battle of Newbury. However recent research has proved that, despite the house being at the centre of the fighting, the King never went to it. Other royals have visited, most notably Elizabeth I. In the 1720s, it was acquired by the flamboyant James Brydges, 1st Duke of Chandos. Although it was not the principal residence of the Duke, the family evidently spent some time in the area and the second Duke bought a wife at a sale in Newbury.

After the first Duke's death in 1744 the dowager duchess lived at Shaw House till her death in 1750. Her step-son sold the property soon afterwards to the Andrews family. It was the childhood home of the historian James Pettit Andrews. For many years it was also a school.

The house is currently owned and managed by West Berkshire Council as a conference venue and public attraction.

== Restoration ==
Following a major restoration Shaw House opened to the public in 2008. It is also a conference venue and home to West Berkshire's register office. Work began in 2005 after the mansion was awarded more than £4 million from the Heritage Lottery Fund. English Heritage and Vodafone also contributed to the project.
