= Donnington Friary =

1393–1538 friary in England

Coordinates: 51.414588°N 1.331057°W

Donnington Friary was a friary of crouched friars at Donnington in the English county of Berkshire. At the time of suppression the establishment was recorded as Trinitarian, but this was later corrected to Crossed Friars. This was possibly a ploy by the two brothers in occupation at the time in order to ensure their pension.

== Establishment ==
In 1376 Sir Richard Abberbury granted land to the Crutched Friars in London for the chapel to be served by two chaplains at Donnington, where a church and dependant priory were erected to the north of the chapel. The friary was established by 1393 when the patients of the hospital at Donnington were mandated to attend mass at the church.

== Forfeit and dissolution ==
The chapel was forfeit in 1448 due to breach by the prior of the terms of the endowment. The establishment was dissolved on 30 November 1538.

== Donnington Priory ==
The site is now occupied by the 17th century mansion named Donnington Priory.

== See also ==
- List of monastic houses in Berkshire
