= Waterside (building) =

Building in Harmondsworth, Greater London, England

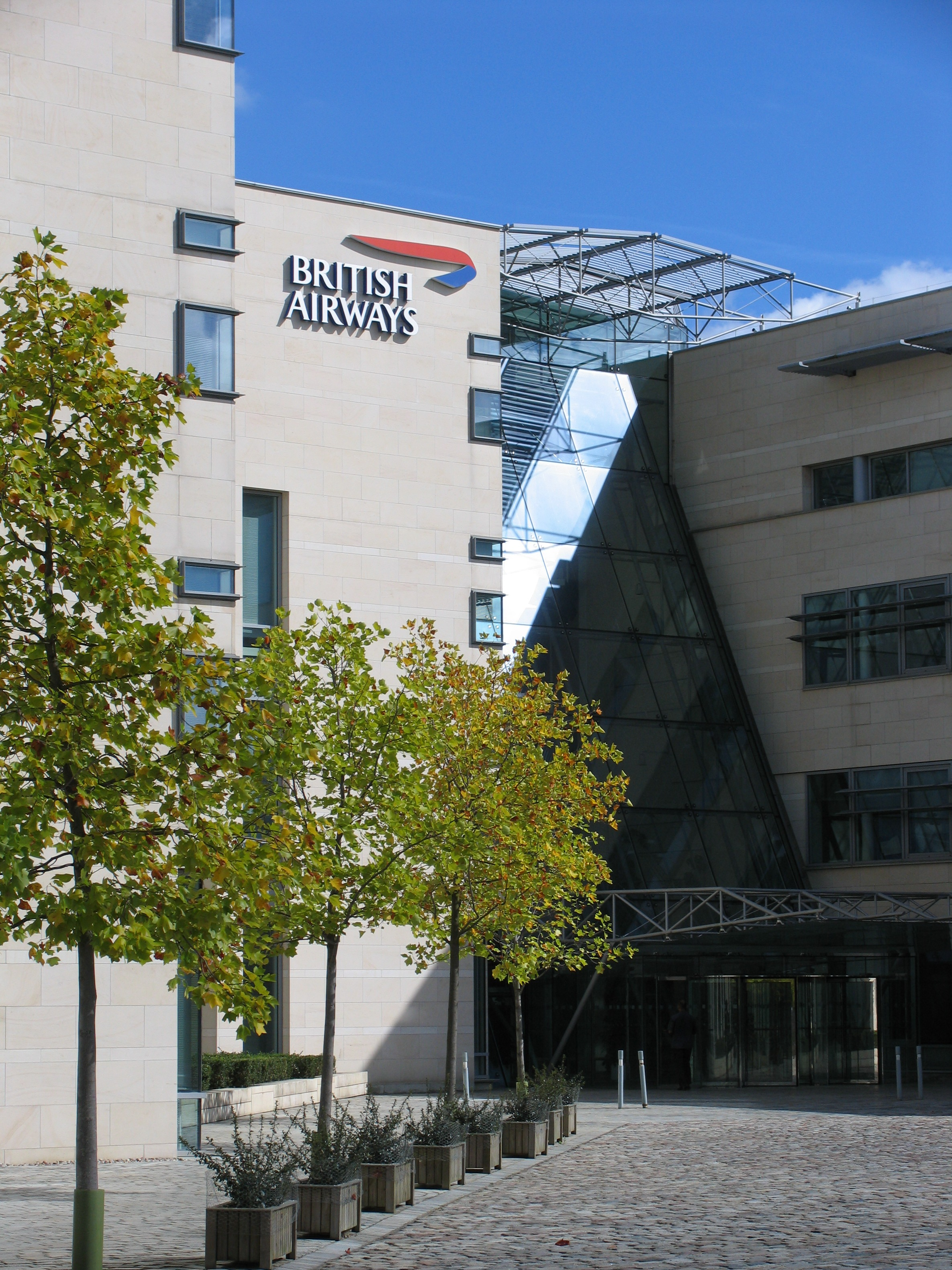
- Waterside

- Location within Greater London

General information
- Location: Harmondsworth, England
- Coordinates: 51°29′08″N 0°29′10″W
- Construction started: 1995
- Completed: 1998
- Cost: £200m
- Owner: British Airways

Design and construction
- Architect: Niels Torp
- Services engineer: Cundall Johnston and Partners

The Waterside building in Harmondsworth, Greater London, is the international head office of British Airways. It also houses the operational head office of BA's parent company, International Airlines Group (IAG). The building and landscaping, which cost £200 million, is on Harmondsworth Moor, northwest of Heathrow Airport, between the M4 and the M25 motorways in the linear Colne Valley regional park. Waterside is on the western edge of Greater London, near West Drayton and Uxbridge, in the Borough of Hillingdon.

The building is likely to be demolished as part of the controversial construction of a third runway at Heathrow.

== History ==
=== Construction ===
British Airways originally submitted a planning application to the London Borough of Hillingdon in 1990 to build what was then called "Prospect Park" on Harmondsworth Moor. This was withdrawn as the airline believed it would be declined on environmental grounds. An alternative plan was drawn up, promising that the moor would be redeveloped and much of the greenspace conserved, which was accepted.

Construction started in September 1995. The project also involved clearing and landscaping the site which was derelict to create a large public park and nature reserve, with a visitor centre. The building was progressively opened between December 1997 and May 1998. The first section of the public park was opened in June 1998, with the remainder in 1999.

The architects were Niels Torp, supported by RHWL. The Building Services Engineers were Cundall, the Structural Engineers were Buro Happold, the Construction Managers were Mace and the Landscape Architects were LUC.

The building was completed in June 1998. The official opening was held that year.

=== Post-construction ===
Around 2004 British Airways consolidated several offices into Waterside. Waterside's employee population increased to about 4,000. To deal with the parking situation, British Airways began limiting on-site parking to four days per week, and a Commuter Centre was established.

In 2020 the majority of the employees at Waterside switched to "work from home", due to the COVID-19 pandemic. British Airways kept the building unoccupied for six months at the height of the pandemic, with its top level employees working at Technical Block C at Heathrow Airport. Simon Calder of The Independent wrote that Waterside was "expected to be demolished if the third runway at Heathrow airport goes ahead." In 2023, British Airways changed course and decided to keep the complex, which had been repopulated by 4000 staff once the company returned to in-office work.

== Composition ==
Nonie Niesewand of The Independent wrote that the site is roughly as big as Regent's Park and that Waterside itself is "the size of a small town" and that it was an attempt by the airline to have a more international and less formal image.

The building includes six sections backing onto a 175-metre (574 ft) glazed atrium street; each section represents a continent served by British Airways. Each section has a different theme based on the continent. For instance, Cherry trees are planted in the Asia-themed section, Eucalyptus trees are planted in the Australia-themed section, Birch saplings were planted in the Europe section, and Hardwood saplings are planted in the North America-themed section. Nonie Niesewand of The Independent said that the head office site is "the size of a small town, but on a site as big as Regent's Park". The building was nicknamed "Ayling Island", after BA chief executive Bob Ayling, by local taxi drivers.

The design includes comprising six limestone-clad four-storey horseshoe-shaped sections which all back on to an internal 'street' that runs inside an atrium. The street is paved in granite slabs and cobblestones, has bridges which cross it overhead, linking the individual buildings, and is looked over by balconies which lead off the bridges. The street houses a health centre, hairdressing and beauty salon, travel centre, Sainsbury's supermarket, restaurants and cafés and a 400-seater auditorium. Jeremy Myerson, author of "After modernism: the contemporary office environment", wrote that the design of Waterside was intended to "both facilitate a change in the way BA staff behave at work and to support a more customer-led culture".

The 9,000-square-metre (97,000 sq ft) gross internal area is mostly open plan offices; no personal space is assigned, although enclosed areas are available for meetings and study. (Although initially no personal places were assigned, in practice, departments have specific locations in the buildings with seat allocations, the overwhelming majority of people sit at the same desks every day and those desks, and the surroundings, contain their personal ephemera just as in any conventional office. "Hot Desks" - those specifically not allocated for an individual - are infrequent and clearly marked.)

== Contents ==
An office of American Airlines is located at the Orient House (HAA3) within Waterside.

== Awards ==
- Civic Trust Awards 2000, Winner
- National Lighting Design Awards of Excellence 2000, Winner
- RIBA Best of British Awards 1999, Winner
- British Council for Offices 1999, Winner
- British Construction Industry Award 1998, Winner

== See also ==
- SAS Frösundavik Office Building
- Cathay City (Cathay Pacific head office at Hong Kong Airport)
- CAL Park (China Airlines head office in Taoyuan, Taiwan)
