= Thomas Penrose =

English cleric and poet

== Life ==
Baptised at Newbury, Berkshire, on 9 September 1742, he was the eldest son of Thomas Penrose, rector of Newbury parish, who died on 20 April 1769. He matriculated at Wadham College, Oxford, on 30 May 1759, but, according to his brother-in-law James Pettit Andrews, was also at Christ Church.

After 1762 Penrose left university and joined a private Anglo-Portuguese expedition to attack of Buenos Aires, under the command of an adventurer named Captain Macnamara. The party left the River Tagus on 30 August 1762, and on its way attacked the settlement of Nova Colonia de Sacramento in the Río de la Plata, which had been seized by the Spanish. The operation was at first successful; but the flagship, the Lord Clive, caught fire, and Macnamara was drowned, with most of the crew. The second vessel, the Ambuscade, of 40 guns, in which Penrose served as a lieutenant of marines, escaped, and ultimately arrived at the Portuguese settlement of Rio de Janeiro.

Penrose returned to England: he had been wounded in the fighting and his health was affected, He graduated B.A. at Hertford College, Oxford on 8 February 1766, took holy orders, and became curate to his father at Newbury. About 1777 he was appointed by a friend to the rectory of Beckington-cum-Standerwick, near Frome in Somerset; but his health failed. He died at Bristol on 20 April 1779, and was buried at Clifton, where a monument was erected in his memory. Penrose's portrait was engraved by William Bromley.

== Works ==
Penrose's productions are mainly imitation of William Collins and Thomas Gray; several of his poems are on the theme of his disappointments in life. A poetical essay, On the Contrarieties of Public Virtue, combined irony and satire.

His major works were:

- Flights of Fancy, 1775.
- Address to the Genius of Britain, 1775, a poem in blank verse, proposing a limit to our "civil dissensions".
- A posthumous volume of poems, 1781, with a biographical introduction by James Pettit Andrews who had married his sister Anne.

Penrose's verses were included in numerous contemporary anthologies. Thomas Campbell included two of Penrose's pieces in his Specimens of the British Poets and Peter Cunningham, in his edition of the work, traced Penrose's influence on Campbell. Thomas James Mathias, in the first dialogue of The Pursuits of Literature (1798), wrote of "neglected Penrose".

== Family ==
In 1768 Penrose married Mary, eldest daughter of Samuel Slocock of Newbury. She remarried at Newbury, in February 1786, the Rev. Thomas Best, master of the free grammar school, and died about 1840, at the age of 94. Thomas Penrose's only child, Thomas, was born in 1769. He studied at Winchester College, became Fellow of New College, Oxford, and vicar of Writtle-cum-Roxwell. In the 1790s, Dr. Thomas Penrose served as secretary to the English envoy to the Duke of Tuscany. He wrote Sketch of the Lives and Writings of Dante and Petrarch (anon. 1790) and died in 1851.

== Notes ==
Attribution

This article incorporates text from a publication now in the public domain: Lee, Sidney, ed. (1895). "Penrose, Thomas". Dictionary of National Biography. Vol. 44. London: Smith, Elder & Co.
