= Cundall (engineering consultancy) =

International multi-disciplinary engineering consultancy

- Type: Partnership
- Industry: Engineering consulting
- Founded: 1976
- Headquarters: Partnership House, Newcastle, United Kingdom
- Key people: Carole O'Neil (Managing Partner)
- Website: www.cundall.com

Cundall is a multi-disciplinary engineering consultancy. Originally based in Newcastle and Edinburgh, the company had spread its operations across five continents.

The firm was founded in 1976 on the basis that it would offer a more client-focused service with a multi-disciplinary and ecologically friendly approach to projects. Five years after its establishment, Cundall expanded into London, and thereafter various other locations, securing increasingly prominent work as a result. During the 1990s and 2000s, a new generation of partners gradually took on operations from Cundall's original founding partners; the company's first managing director, David Dryden, was appointed in 2002. Significant expansion of the company occurred during the 2010s, although job losses occurred during the COVID-19 pandemic of the early 2020s. Cundall has frequently advocated for environmental sustainability and sympathetic development; it plans for all of the firm's undertakings to achieve new zero carbon by 2030.

== Development ==
During 1976, Cundall, Johnston and Partners was established, having been co-founded by Geoffrey Cundall, Rick Carr, Michael Burch, David Gandy and Bernard Johnston. The partnership was later rebranded as Cundall. A common belief held by the founders was that the construction industry was chaotic and could be better organised; Cundall thus sought to deliver projects via a people-centric multi-disciplinary approach that incorporated structural, civil, electrical and mechanical engineering.

As directed by several of its founders, the company has long maintained an emphasis on ecologically friendly development. Referred to as low energy design early on, sustainability in Cundall's undertakings was pursued from the firm's early years. Company representatives have often publicly spoken out on the topic and promoted the incorporation of low energy solutions and new technologies to minimise environmental impact and increase efficiency; the company has also set a goal for all of its undertakings to achieve new zero carbon by 2030.

Initially, the firm's activities were initially centred around the northern cities of Newcastle and Edinburgh. During 1981, at the urging of Carr, the company's London office was established; Carr and Laurie Clark secured numerous key clients in London that led to Cundall being awarded roles in numerous high-profile projects, including the headquarters of several major firms, such as Swiss Bank, British Airways and Deutsche Bank. The next three offices opened by the firm were in Birmingham, Manchester, and Sydney - the latter being the start of Cundall's international expansion. The company had pursued a strategy of wholly organic expansion; this has been not only in terms of geographic coverage but also in terms of the disciplines offered to prospective clients, such as IT, geotechnics, fire protection engineering, lighting design and acoustics.

During 1989, founder Geoffrey Cundall departed the firm; he died in early 2015. During 2002, David Dryden was appointed as Cundall's first managing partner; a new generation of partners gradually took on day-to-day operations of the firm from the remaining founds around this time.

In early 2009, Cundall took legal action against a hotel group over its failure to pay for work performed on a luxury hotel adjacent to St Paul's Cathedral in London.

The 2010s saw significant expansion of the company. By 2014, Cundall was operating numerous offices around the world; in the United Kingdom, it had offices in London, Newcastle, Edinburgh, Birmingham, Belfast, and Manchester; its Australian offices were in Sydney, Perth, Melbourne, Brisbane, and Adelaide; the Asian offices included Hong Kong, Shanghai, Manila, and Singapore; and its Middle East and North African (MENA) offices were in Dubai, Doha, and Tripoli, and European offices in Dublin, Bucharest, Paphos, Madrid, and Wrocław. In 2014, Tomás Neeson took over as managing partner.

In July 2020, amid the COVID-19 pandemic, the firm announced that it would shed as many as 40 jobs; at the time, it employed 550 UK-based employees. In July 2024, Rick Carr, one of Cundall's founding partners and a key figure at the firm for almost half a century, died.

== Awards ==
- The Construction Skills Cut the Carbon Award, 2013 The Building Awards.
- The open BIM Build Qatar Live, 2012 Build Qatar Live.
- The Legacy Award – Sustainability, 2012 West Midland Centre for Consulting Excellence.
- Consultancy Practice of the Year, 2012 Constructing Excellence in the North East Awards.
- Australia's Zero Carbon Sustainable house: Collaborative Future, 2012 Zero Carbon Challenge.
- Romania Green Building Council Awards, two awards:
  - Sustainable Company of the Year, 2011.
  - Green Service Provider of the Year, 2011.
- Sustainable Consultant of the year award, 2010 Building Sustainability Awards.
- Most Sustainable Remediation Project, 2010 Remediation Innovation Awards
- Research, Studies and Consulting Award, 2010 ACE Engineering Excellence awards.
- Cadbury Bournville Place, two awards:
  - 2009 British Council for Offices (BCO) Awards, Corporate Workplace, Regional Award.
  - 2009 Royal Institute of British Architects (RIBA) Award, West Midlands Region.
- David Clark awarded the 2008 Sustainability Champion of the year award, UK Sustainable Building Services Awards 2008.
- 180 Great Portland Street, London, 2008 British Council for Offices (BCO) Awards, Innovation category.
- ISG Headquarters, Aldgate House, London. Three major awards at the 2007 British Council for Offices (BCO) Awards.
  - Best of the best award
  - National award, fit-out of workplace
  - Regional award, London, fit-out of workplace

In 2016, Cundall won the Consultant of the Year award at the Construction News Awards, as organised by Construction News.

== Selected projects ==
=== United Kingdom ===
- 2 Snow Hill, Birmingham
- BA Waterside, Harmondsworth, London
- Centre Point, London
- UK Astronomy Technology Centre, Edinburgh
- Vodafone headquarters building, Newbury
- Excelsior Academy, Newcastle
- Mann Island Buildings, Liverpool
- One Hyde Park, London
- Sage Group headquarters building, Newcastle
- Wellcome Trust Gibbs Building, Euston Road, London
- Lambeth Academy, London
- University of St Andrews Arts Faculty Building, St Andrews
- Cadbury Bournville Place, Bournville, Birmingham
- New Street Square, London
- Capital One, Loxley House, Nottingham
- Durham Gateway, Durham University, Durham
- Tyneside Cinema, Newcastle
- Bede Academy, Northumberland
- Aston University Engineering Academy, Birmingham

=== Australia ===
- 1 Bligh Street, Sydney
- St Leonard's College (Melbourne) Sustainability Centre, Melbourne
- 480 Queen Street, Brisbane
- 30 The Bond, Sydney
- Coca-Cola Place, Sydney
- Mildura Airport, Victoria (Australia)
- Royal Children's Hospital, Melbourne
- Sydney Airport, Sydney
- Westfield Sydney, Sydney
- Milson Island Recreation Centre, New South Wales
- Rouse Hill Town Centre, Sydney
- Ravenswood School for Girls, Sydney

=== MENA ===
- Deloitte Emaar Square, UAE
- Desert Canyon Resort, UAE
- Dubawi Island, UAE
- Jumeirah Zabeel Saray, UAE
- Nurai Island, UAE
- Porto Dubai Island, UAE
- Regulation and Supervision Bureau (RSB) Office, UAE
- Tiara United Towers, UAE
- TNS, Makeen Tower, UAE
- Libyan European Hospital, Libya
- Santa Monica Beach Resort, Boa Vista Island, Cape Verde

=== Europe ===
- General Electric Headquarters, Madrid, Spain
- Paris Data Centre, Paris, France
- Bukowice – Low energy detached house, Bokowice, Poland
- Stara Mennica, Warsaw, Poland
- Facebook Luleå, Luleå, Sweden
- Colosseum Shopping Centre, Bucharest, Romania
- Cultural Buildings, Tasnad Refurbishment, Tasnad, Romania
- Dealul Lomb, Cluj, Romania
- Hampton Hotel, Brasov, Romania
- Italiana 24, Bucharest, Romania
- Vatra Dornei Hotel, Vatra Dornei, Romania

=== Asia ===
- Shenzhen Office Building, Hong Kong
- Eaton Hotel Chiller Replacement, Hong Kong
- Happy Valley Data Centre, Hong Kong
- Hong Kong Children's Hospital, Hong Kong
- Hong Kong Science Park, Phase 3, Hong Kong
- Jurong Data Centre, Jurong, Singapore
- Ascendas iHub Suzhou, Suzhou, China
- Corporate fit-out, Shanghai, China
- Da Zhongli, Shanghai, China
- Hakkasan, Shanghai, China
- HASSELL Shanghai Studio, China
- MGM MACAU, Macau, China
- UNICO Restaurant at The Bund, Shanghai, China
- Taiwan Tower International Competition, Taichung, Taiwan

== Gallery ==
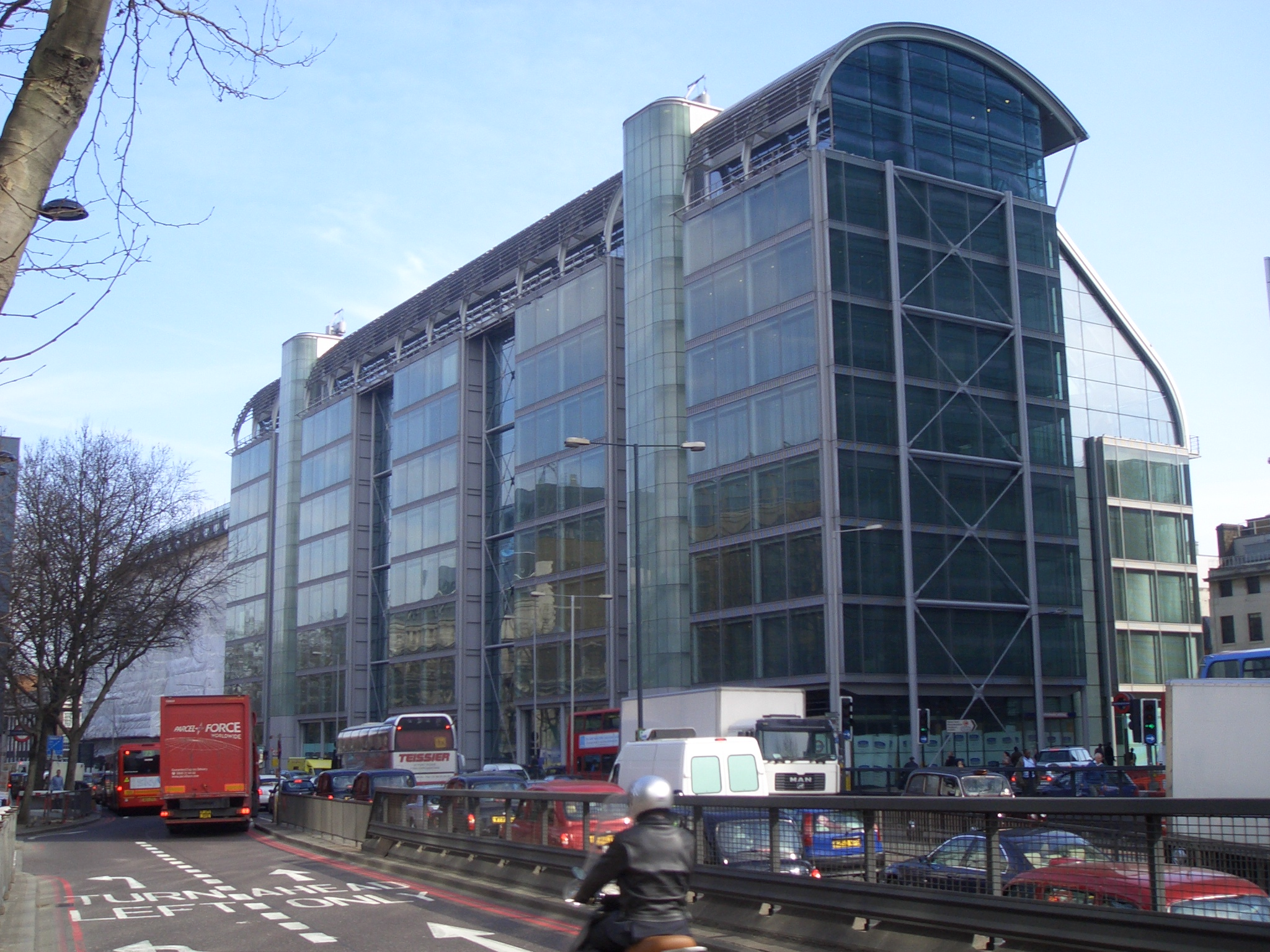
The Wellcome Trust's Gibbs Building on Euston Road, London

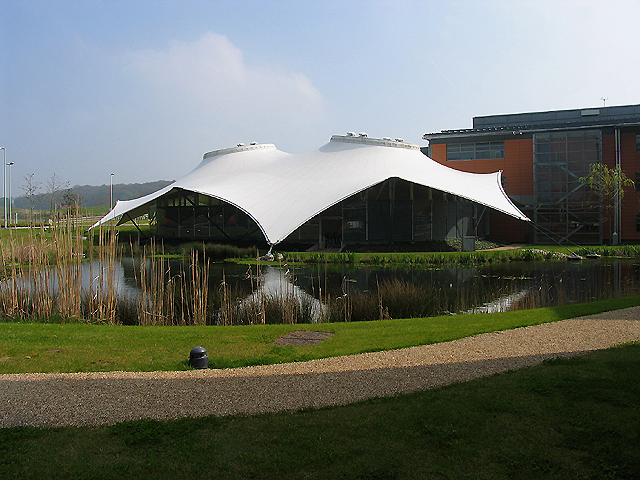
New Vodafone Headquarters building, Newbury

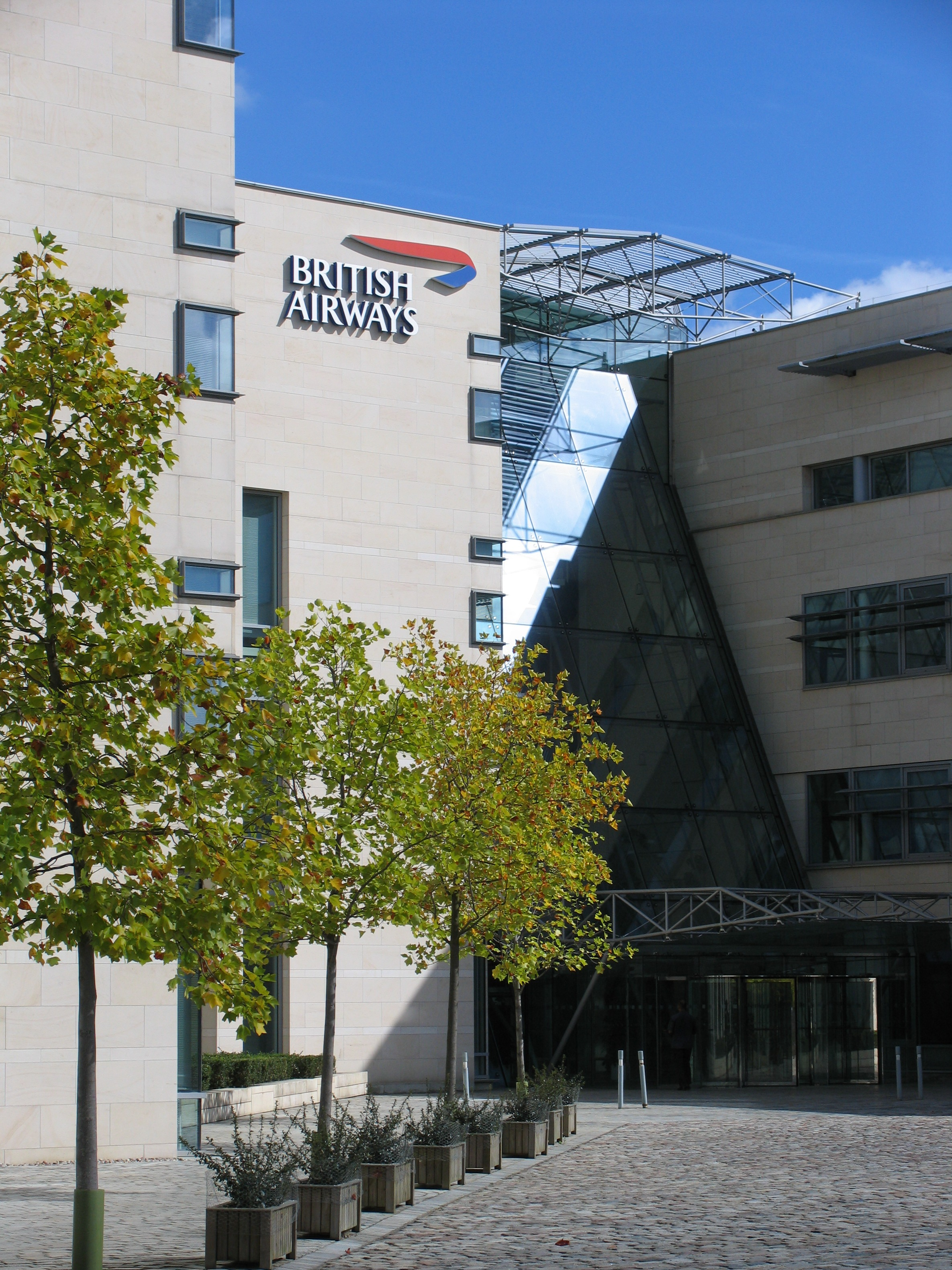
The Waterside building, London

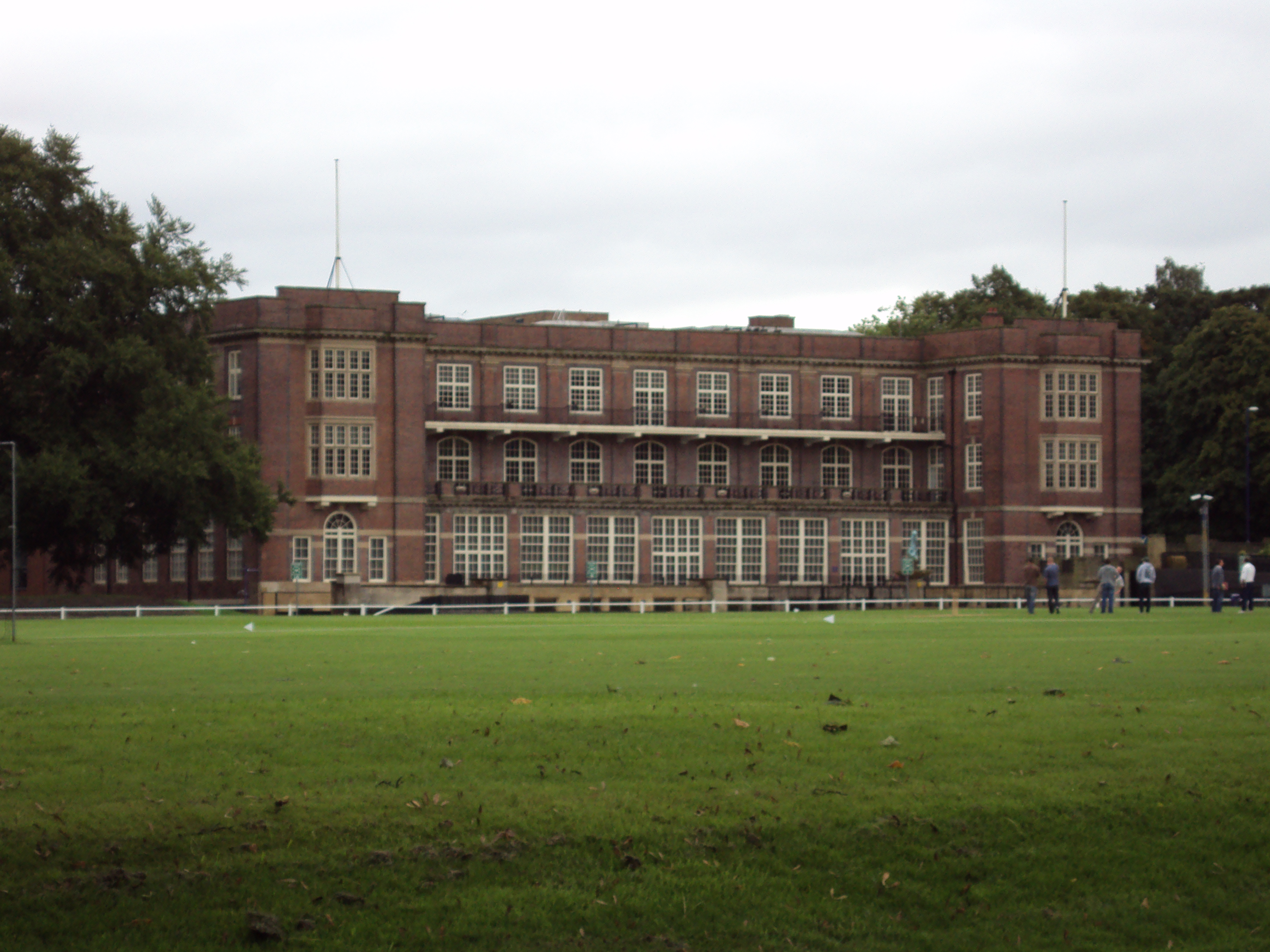
Cadbury Bournville Place, Bournville

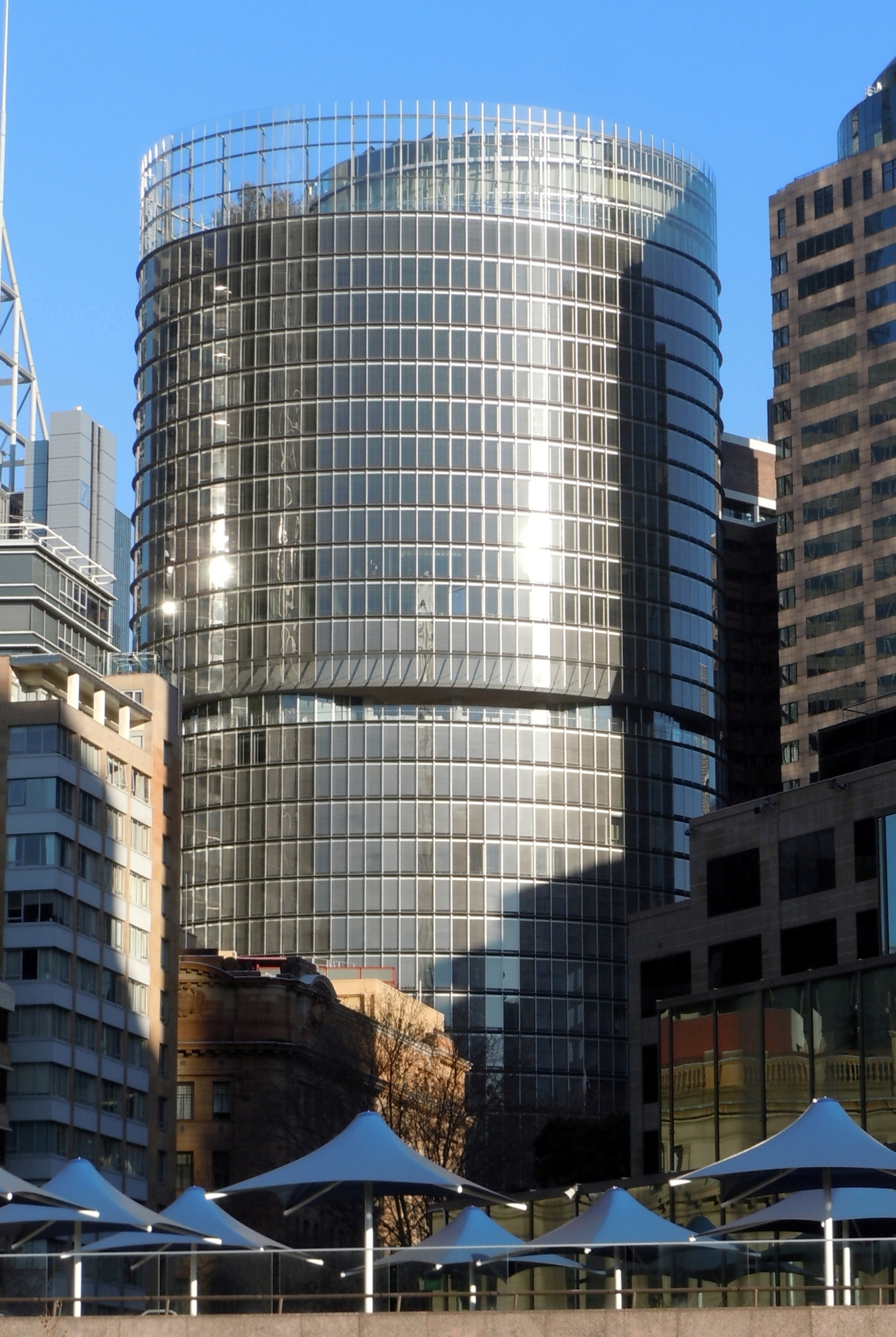
1 Bligh Street, Sydney

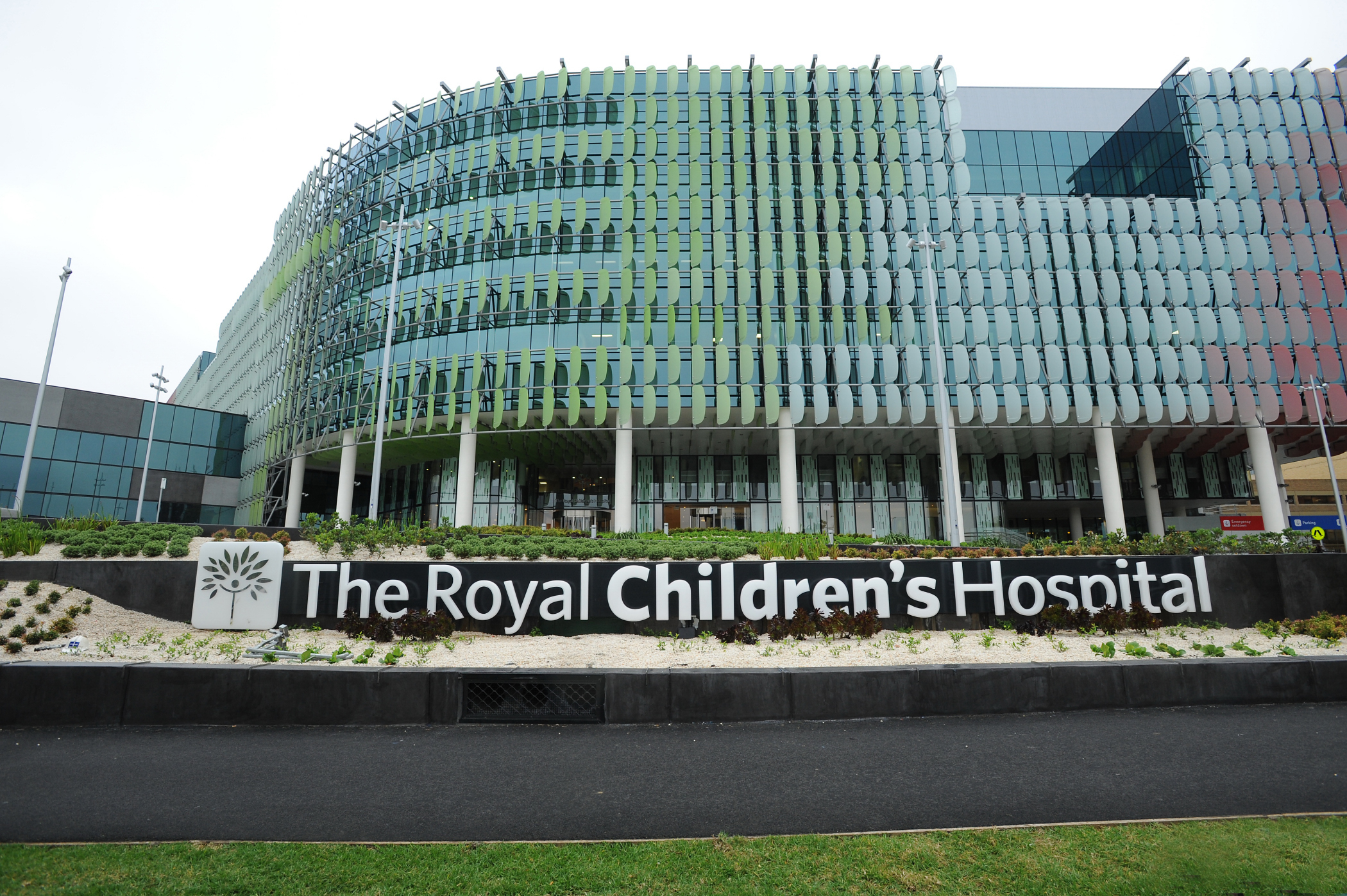
The Royal Children's Hospital, Melbourne
