= Donnington, Berkshire =

Village in Berkshire, England

Coordinates: 51°25′05″N 1°19′52″W

Donnington
- Village
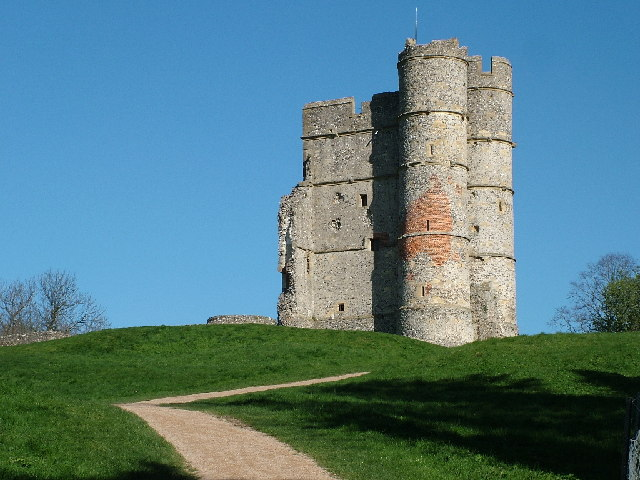
- Donnington Castle

- Location within Berkshire
- OS grid reference: SU467693
- Civil parish: Shaw-cum-Donnington
- Unitary authority: West Berkshire
- Ceremonial county: Berkshire
- Region: South East
- Country: England
- Sovereign state: United Kingdom
- Post town: Newbury
- Postcode district: RG14
- Dialling code: 01635
- Police: Thames Valley
- Fire: Royal Berkshire
- Ambulance: South Central
- UK Parliament: Newbury

Donnington is a village in the civil parish of Shaw-cum-Donnington in West Berkshire, England. It is located north of the town of Newbury. It contains a ruined medieval castle and a Strawberry Hill Gothic mansion.

== Notable buildings ==
=== Castle ===
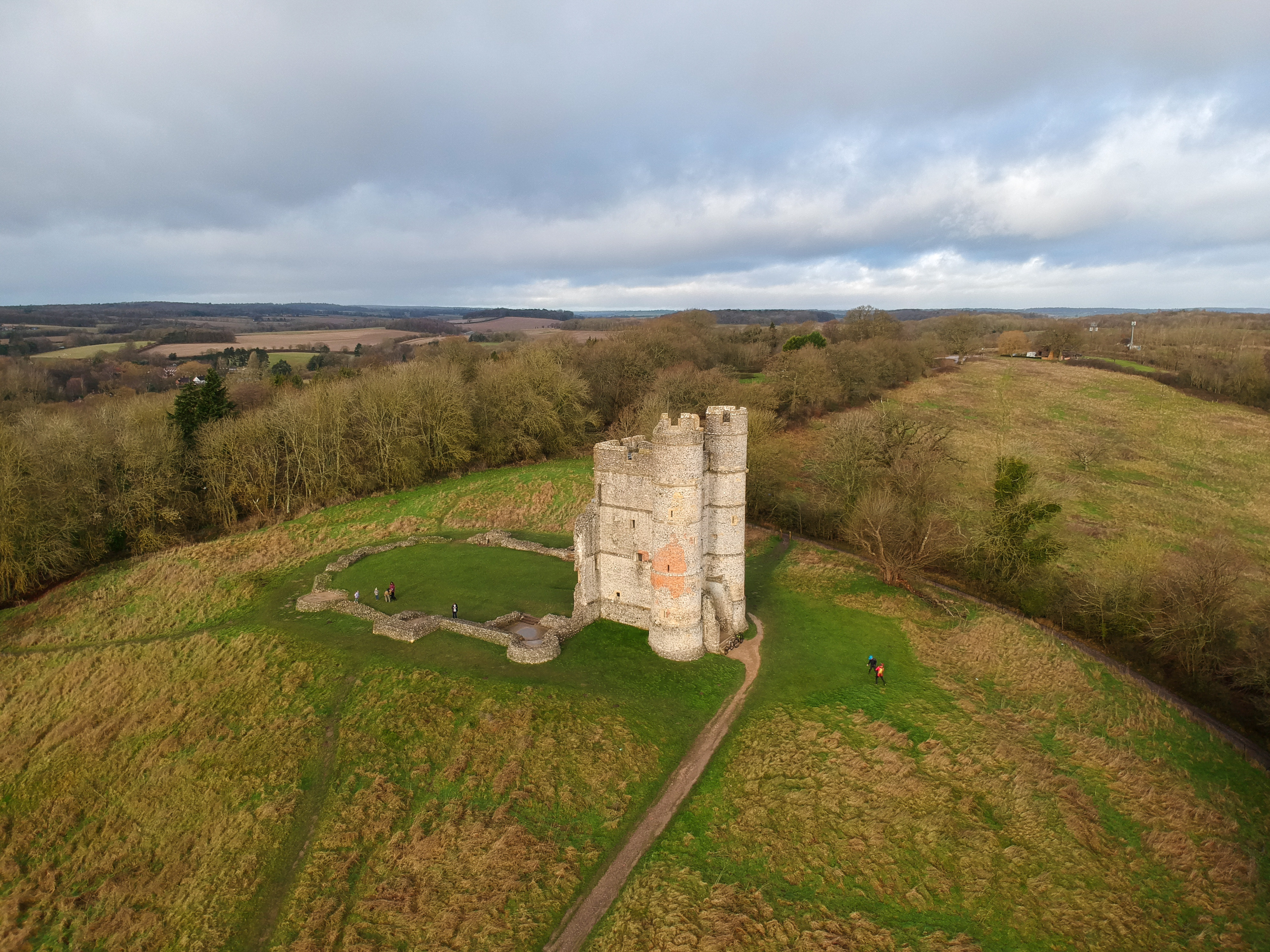
Aerial photo of Donnington Castle in 2020

Donnington Castle, a ruined medieval castle of some historical significance, was the home of Richard Abberbury the Elder. The second Battle of Newbury (27 October 1644) was fought between Newbury and Donnington as an attack on the castle, which was held for the Royalists by Sir John Boys. The main entrance range of Donnington Castle House was built in 1648 to incorporate an earlier lodge.

=== Hospital almshouses ===
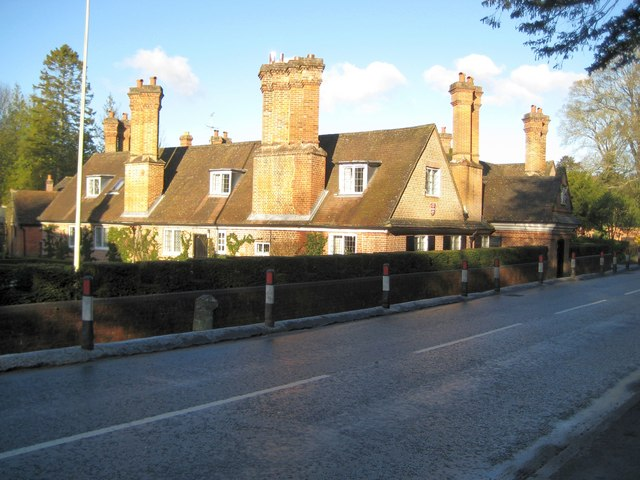
Donnington Hospital Almshouses

Donnington Hospital almshouses, founded in 1393, form the oldest charity in the county, although others formed later had older charities merged into them. Robert Beaugraunt is recorded as minister of the poor in 1412. The earliest current building dates from 1602, but the complex is wide-ranging, with additional modern almshouses having been built in Bucklebury and Iffley.

=== Others ===
Other notable buildings include Donnington Priory and Donnington Grove. The latter is a Strawberry Hill Gothic mansion built by the antiquary and translator James Pettit Andrews in 1763–1772. It is now a hotel in the centre of a golf course.

== Transport ==
Donnington has regular bus services to Newbury. A station at Speen on the Lambourn Valley Railway was advertised as Speen for Donnington until about 1932, the line closed to passenger traffic in 1960.

== Famous residents ==
- Richard Abberbury the Elder (1331–1399), chamberlain to Anne of Bohemia, Queen to King Richard II of England, owned estates in Donnington.
- Albemarle Bertie (1755–1824), Royal Navy officer and later Admiral during the American Revolutionary War and Napoleonic Wars, retired to Donnington Priory.
- Beau Brummell (1778–1840), Regency dandy, lived at Donnington Grove.
- Sebastian Faulks (born 1953), journalist and author, was born in the village.
- Thomas Hughes (1822–1896), author of Tom Brown's Schooldays, lived at Donnington Priory.
- Barbara Euphan Todd (1890–1976), author of the Worzel Gummidge series of stories for children, died at Donnington.

== Sources ==
- Ditchfield, P.H.; Page, William (1907). Victoria County History: A History of the County of Berkshire, Volume 2. pp. 91–94.
- Page, William; Ditchfield, P. H. (1924). Victoria County History: A History of the County of Berkshire, Volume 4. pp. 87–97.
- Pevsner, Nikolaus (1966). The Buildings of England: Berkshire. Harmondsworth: Penguin Books. pp. 128–29.
