= National Network Management Centre =

- NNMC
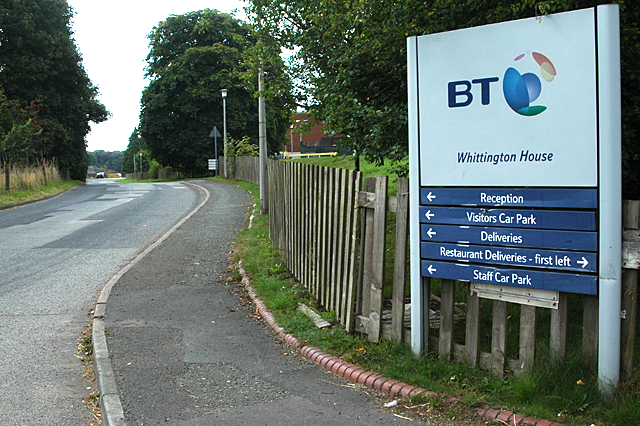
- Main entrance to the site in August 2009

- Location within Shropshire
- Alternative names: Whittington House

General information
- Type: Office
- Location: Whittington, Shropshire, SY11 4TB
- Coordinates: 52.87°N 3.029°W
- Elevation: 50 m (164 ft)
- Completed: 1990
- Inaugurated: 5 September 1990
- Cost: £4m (1990)
- Client: BT
- Owner: BT Group

The National Network Management Centre is the main national network operations centre of BT Group, situated in Shropshire.

== History ==
=== Former sites ===
The GPO opened a national network management centre and telecommunications engineering centre at Brogyntyn Hall in Oswestry in 1957, moving from Dollis Hill, which moved to Whittington in 1982.

=== Whittington ===
The NMC is also known as the Customer Experience and Management Centre, the International Network Management Centre (INMC), or the National Control Centre (NCC).

The BT Global Media Network delivers television content around the world. BT Retail split into BT Consumer and BT Business.

The network management centre was officially opened January 6 1987 by John Biffen, at the Trunk Network Operations Centre.

The transformation of BT's network to becoming digital began in 1985, and finished in July 1990. BT's Worldwide Network Management Centre at Oswestry opened on 5 September 1990, at a cost of £4m.

In 1990 the national trunk network became wholly digital. Later in 1990, the site took over the Speaking Clock. A Philips Vidiwall was installed in September 1990, being formed of 140 screens, 28x5 screens, costing around £1m. The system worked with the US NTSC television system, not the European PAL system, as NTSC is 60 cycles per second and PAL is 50.

From May 2002 two hundred new staff moved in when network management sites in Manchester, Walsall and Cambridge closed. The video wall was replaced.

The site appeared on the BBC Two documentary Genius of Invention.

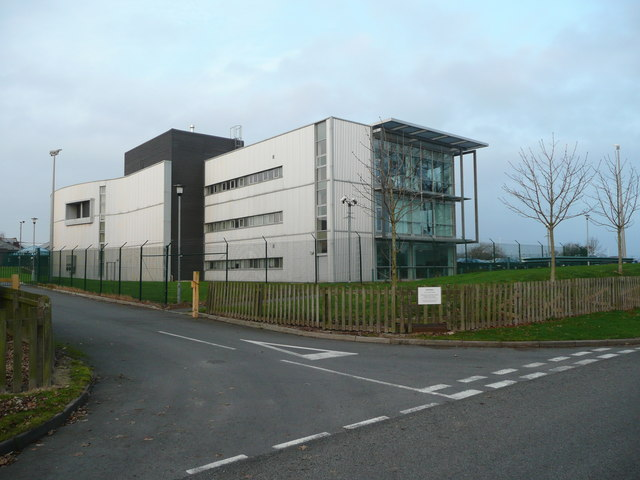
Side entrance from the east in 2008

== Structure ==
It is situated on the A495, within a few hundred yards of the road's western terminus at the roundabout with the A5, in the west of the parish of Whittington.

The site has a staff of around 440. Jamie Ford, the former chief executive of Plusnet, runs BT IT Services.

There were originally two buildings - A and B. Building C was built to link these together and forms the hexagonal reception building. Building D was built to be the new Network Management Centre, which has now been superseded by the New Wave Building.

=== Display screen ===
The site has a large display screen, built by Synelec (bought by Planar Systems), made from 140 composite screens. The screen is ten feet high, and seventy feet wide.

== Function ==
The site is the home of the UK's speaking clock. BT IT Services, headquartered at Barlborough in Derbyshire on the A616, have a main operation in the building.

It monitors network traffic on BT's network across the UK, including 0800, 0845 and 999 numbers. It monitors televotes provide by RIDE (Recorded Information Distribution Equipment). RIDE is accessed via the SOAP protocol.

At peak periods it implements call gapping load control. BT Wholesale controls its traffic from the site.

Every two minutes the site contacts around 700 of BT's telephone exchanges to find out how busy they are. 80% of BT's network consists of optical fibre.

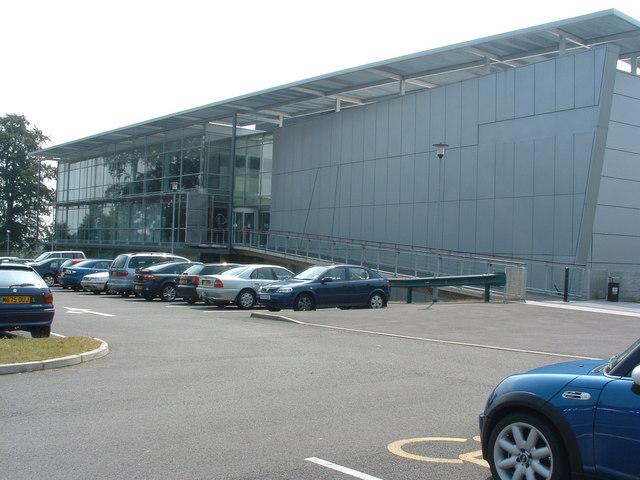
The site in June 2006

They can apply routing changes to the network if an issue arises such as a major loss of power to an area or an emergency number being announced following a disaster or restrict calls to that number. They also monitor the main news channels to get early indication of a major incident. In addition calls being routed via the UK BT network from foreign telecom groups (i.e. USA to Far East) are monitored and controlled here.

== See also ==
- Institute of Telecommunications Professionals
- Telecommunications in the United Kingdom
- Category:Network performance
- Erlang distribution
- Vodafone World Headquarters
- Yarnfield Park in Yarnfield, Staffordshire, the former main BT training centre
