= Shaw-cum-Donnington =

Coordinates: 51°24′54″N 1°18′54″W

Shaw cum Donnington
- Civil parish
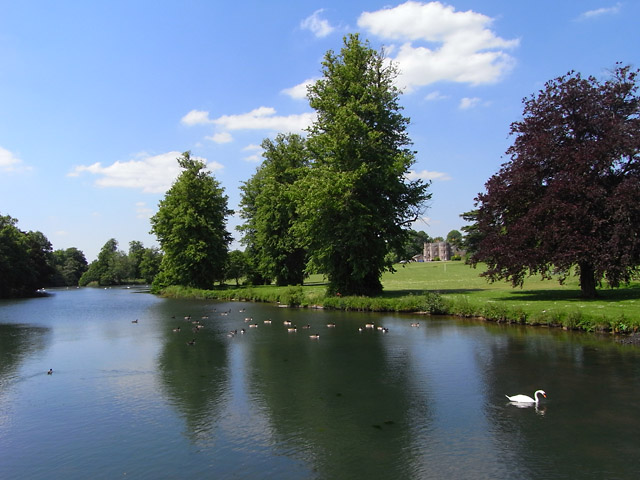
- Lake, lawn and house at Donnington Grove, the area's hotel resort

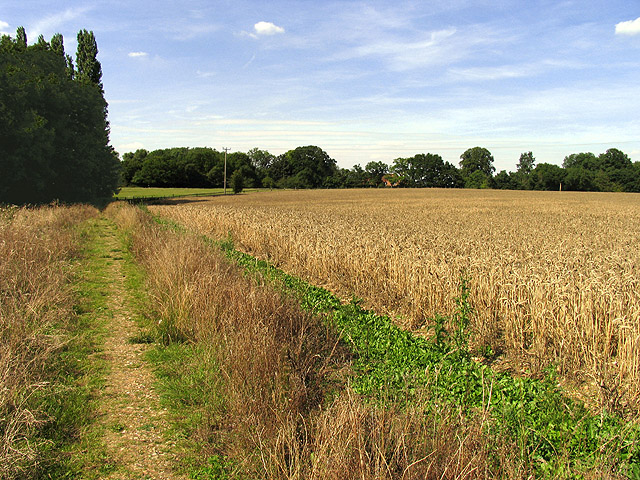
- Public footpath across barley field, typical of the north of the area

- Location within Berkshire
- Area: 8.6 km^{2} (3.3 sq mi)
- Population: 1,674 (2021 census)
  - Density: 195/km^{2} (510/sq mi)
- OS grid reference: SU4767
  - London: 51 miles (82 km)
- Civil parish: Shaw cum Donnington
- Unitary authority: West Berkshire
- Ceremonial county: Berkshire
- Region: South East
- Country: England
- Sovereign state: United Kingdom
- Post town: Newbury
- Postcode district: RG14
- Dialling code: 01635
- Police: Thames Valley
- Fire: Royal Berkshire
- Ambulance: South Central
- UK Parliament: Newbury

Shaw-cum-Donnington is a civil parish in West Berkshire, England, with all of its urban or suburban area immediately north of the largest town in the district, Newbury. It comprises the villages of Shaw and Donnington, and contains the partially ruined Donnington Castle, which has most of its various outside walls intact. The area is mostly green space but where developed is almost entirely residential with shops and cafés. It has housing immediately north of the town of Newbury.

== Amenities ==
The ecclesiastical parish, which crosses the River Lambourn bounding the civil parish to the south for a few hundred metres, is of the same name. It has one church which has an active Church of England community at Shaw. and also has the area's Church of England primary school.

The Vodafone World Headquarters are in the south of the village.

== Demographics ==
At the 2021 census, Shaw cum Donnington civil parish recorded a population of 1,674 people in 722 households.

Census population of Shaw cum Donnington parish
Census	Population	Female	Male	Households	Source
2001	1,680	866	814	685	
2011	1,686	862	824	707	
2021	1,674	840	834	722	

2011 Published Statistics: Population, home ownership and extracts from physical environment, surveyed in 2005
Output area	Homes owned outright	Owned with a loan	Socially rented	Privately rented	Other	km^{2} roads	km^{2} water	km^{2} domestic gardens	Usual residents	km^{2}
Civil parish	231	216	162	83	13	0.240	0.110	0.494	1686	8.6
