= James Pettit Andrews =

English historian and antiquary (1737–1797)

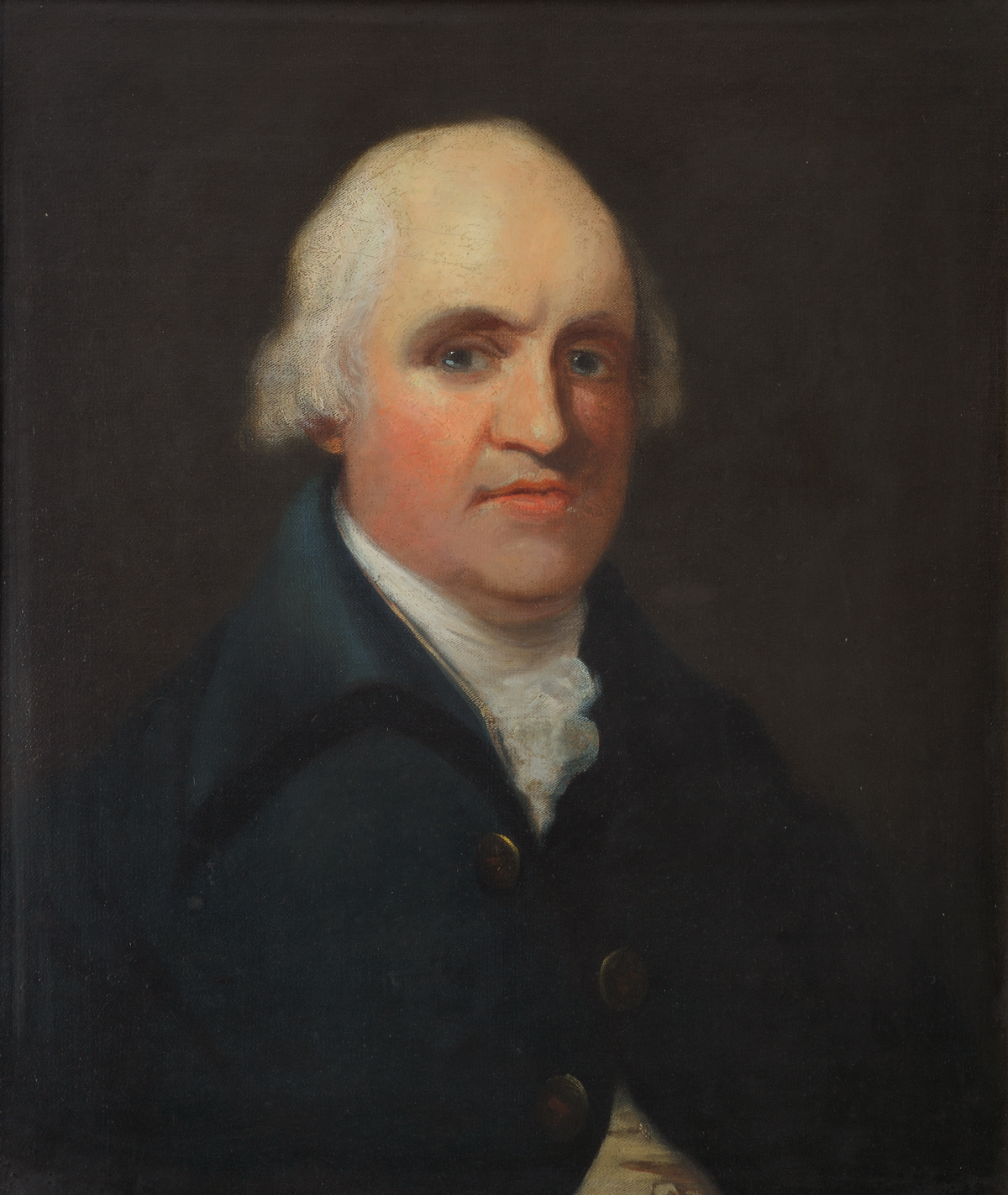
- James Pettit Andrews, portrait from the 1790s by Samuel Drummond
- Born: 1737
- Died: 6 August 1797 (aged 59–60); Brompton, London
- Known for: historian, antiquary
- Notable work: History of Great Britain connected with the Chronology of Europe from Caesar's Invasion to Accession of Edward VI

James Pettit Andrews (1737– 6 August 1797) was an English historian and antiquary.

== Life ==
He was the younger son of Joseph Andrews of Shaw House, near Newbury in Berkshire, and his second wife Elizabeth Pettit; Sir Joseph Andrews, 1st Baronet (1727–1800) was his elder brother. He was educated privately, and having taken to the law was one of the magistrates at the police court in Queen Square, Westminster, from 1792 to his death.

Andrews built himself the Strawberry Hill Gothic mansion of Donnington Grove, near the family home, in 1763, designed by John Chute. He sold the house in 1783. He was a regular participant in the work of the Committee for the Relief of the Black Poor in the 1780s.

Andrews died at Brompton and was buried in Hampstead Church.

== Works ==
His major work was a History of Great Britain connected with the Chronology of Europe from Caesar's Invasion to Accession of Edward VI, in 2 volumes (London, 1794–1795). A portion of the history of England is given on one page, facing a general sketch of the contemporany history of Europe on the opposite page. He also wrote a History of Great Britain from Death of Henry VIII to Accession of James VI of Scotland – a continuation of Robert Henry's History of Great Britain, which left off at the death of Henry VIII – published in 1796 and again in 1806.

Andrews translated a German tragedy of Christoph Unzer with Henry James Pye. It was published in 1798 as The Inquisitor. Others works include The Savages of Europe (London, 1764), a satire on the English which he translated from the French of Robert-Martin Lesuire (1737–1815) and Louvel; and Anecdotes Ancient and Modern (London, 1789), a collection of gossip.

== Family ==
Andrews married Anne, daughter of Thomas Penrose, rector of Newbury, and sister of Thomas Penrose the poet. He edited an edition (1781) of his brother-in-law's works.
