= Donnington Castle =

Ruined castle in Berkshire, England

- Near Donnington, Berkshire in England
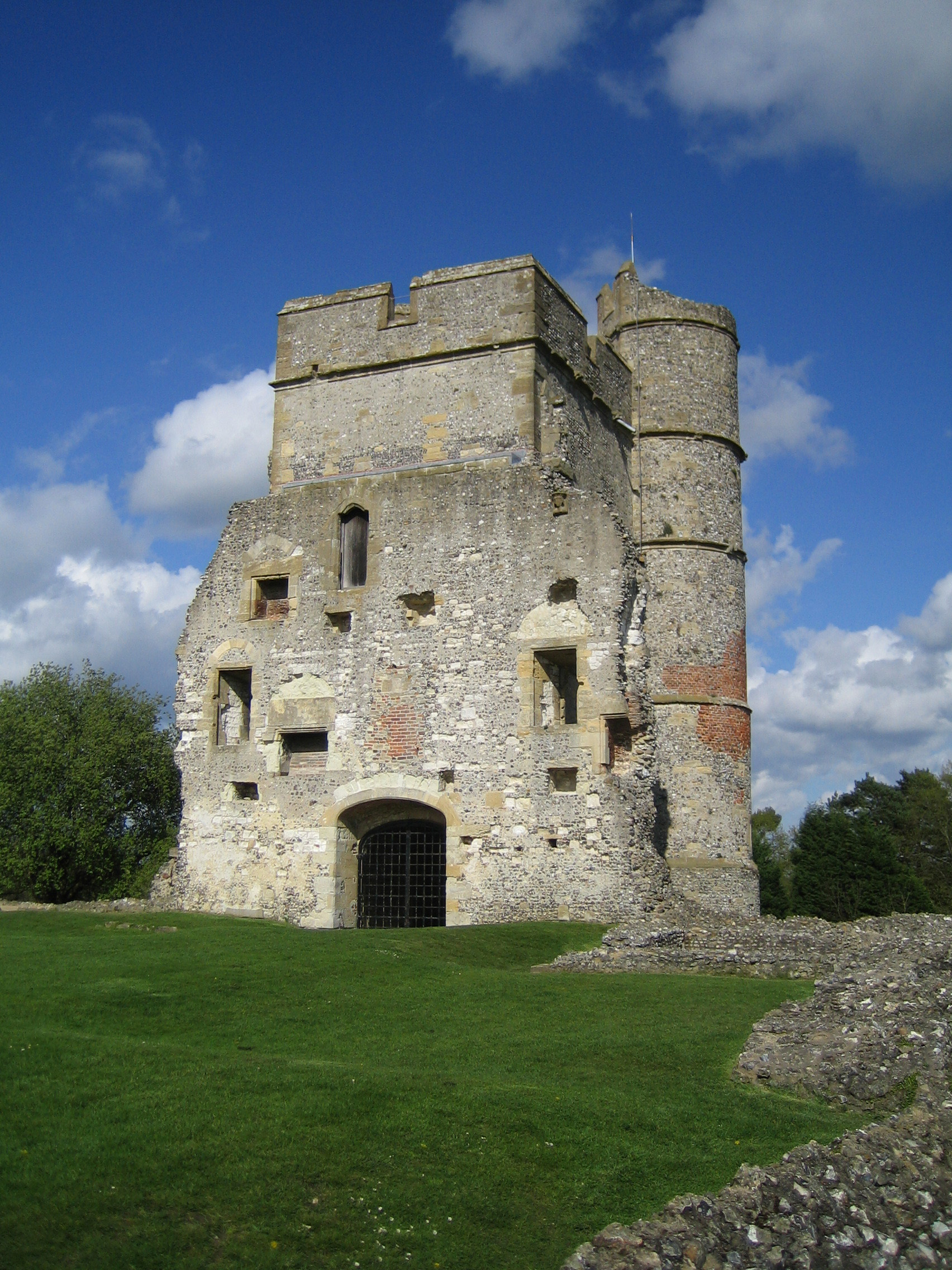
- Ruins of Donnington Castle

Site information
- Owner: English Heritage
- Open to the public: Yes
- Condition: Ruins

Location
- Shown within Berkshire
- Coordinates: 51°25′10″N 001°20′15″W grid reference SU46106914

Site history
- Built: 1386
- Built by: Sir Richard Abberbury the Elder
- In use: 1386-1646

Garrison information
- Designations: Scheduled Ancient Monument no. 1007926

Donnington Castle is a ruined medieval castle, situated in the small village of Donnington, just north of the town of Newbury in the English county of Berkshire. It was founded by Sir Richard Abberbury the Elder in 1386 and was bought by Thomas Chaucer before the castle was taken under royal control during the Tudor period. During the First English Civil War the castle was held by the royalist Sir John Boys and withstood an 18-month siege; after the garrison eventually surrendered, Parliament voted to demolish Donnington Castle in 1646. Only the gatehouse survives. The site is a scheduled monument under the care of English Heritage.

== History ==
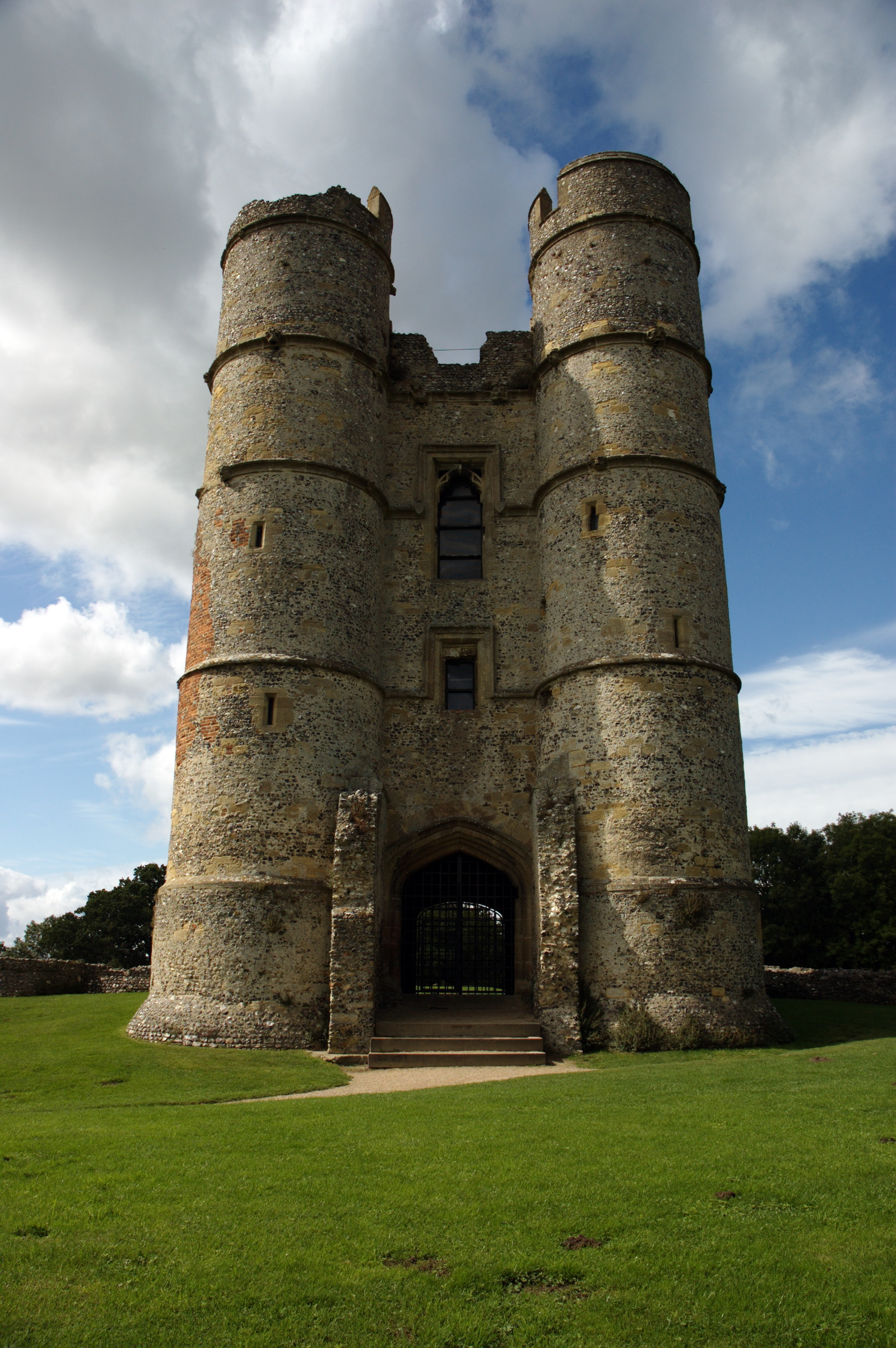
The twin-towered gatehouse

The manor of Donnington had been owned by the Abberbury family since 1292, Donnington Castle was built by its original owner, Sir Richard Abberbury the Elder, under a licence granted by Richard II in 1386. The surviving castle gatehouse dates from this time. In 1398, the castle was sold to Thomas Chaucer, son of the poet Geoffrey Chaucer, as a residence for his daughter Alice, who later became Duchess of Suffolk. The Duke of Suffolk William De La Pole made Donnington his occasional residence, and considerably enlarged the buildings.

This family later fell out with the Tudor monarchs, and the castle became a royal property. In 1514 it was given to Charles Brandon, 1st Duke of Suffolk. Though Brandon appears to have stayed at the Donnington Castle in 1516, by the time the castle and manor returned to the Crown in 1535 the structure was in a state of decay. King Henry VIII, Edward VI, and Queen Elizabeth I visited Donnington Castle, in 1539, 1552, and 1568 respectively.

In 1590 Elizabeth I granted keepership to Elizabeth Cooke (Lady Russell), the first woman to hold such a title in England. In 1600, Elizabeth I gave the castle and surrounding manor to Charles Howard, 1st Earl of Nottingham. Howard took possession in September 1603 and Russell disputed his rights. By the time the English Civil War broke out in 1643, the castle was owned by the Parliamentarian John Packer family but after the First Battle of Newbury it was taken for the King, Charles I, and held by Sir John Boys. They quickly enhanced the castle's defences by adding earthworks in a star shape to provide gun emplacements. Parliamentarians laid siege to the castle in October 1644 and the garrison held out for 18 months. With permission from the king, Boys surrendered the castle in April 1646 and was allowed to leave with all his men.

In 1646 Parliament voted to demolish the castle; only the gatehouse was left standing though the 17th-century earthworks can still be seen. The castle is now in the care of English Heritage and is a scheduled ancient monument number 1007926.

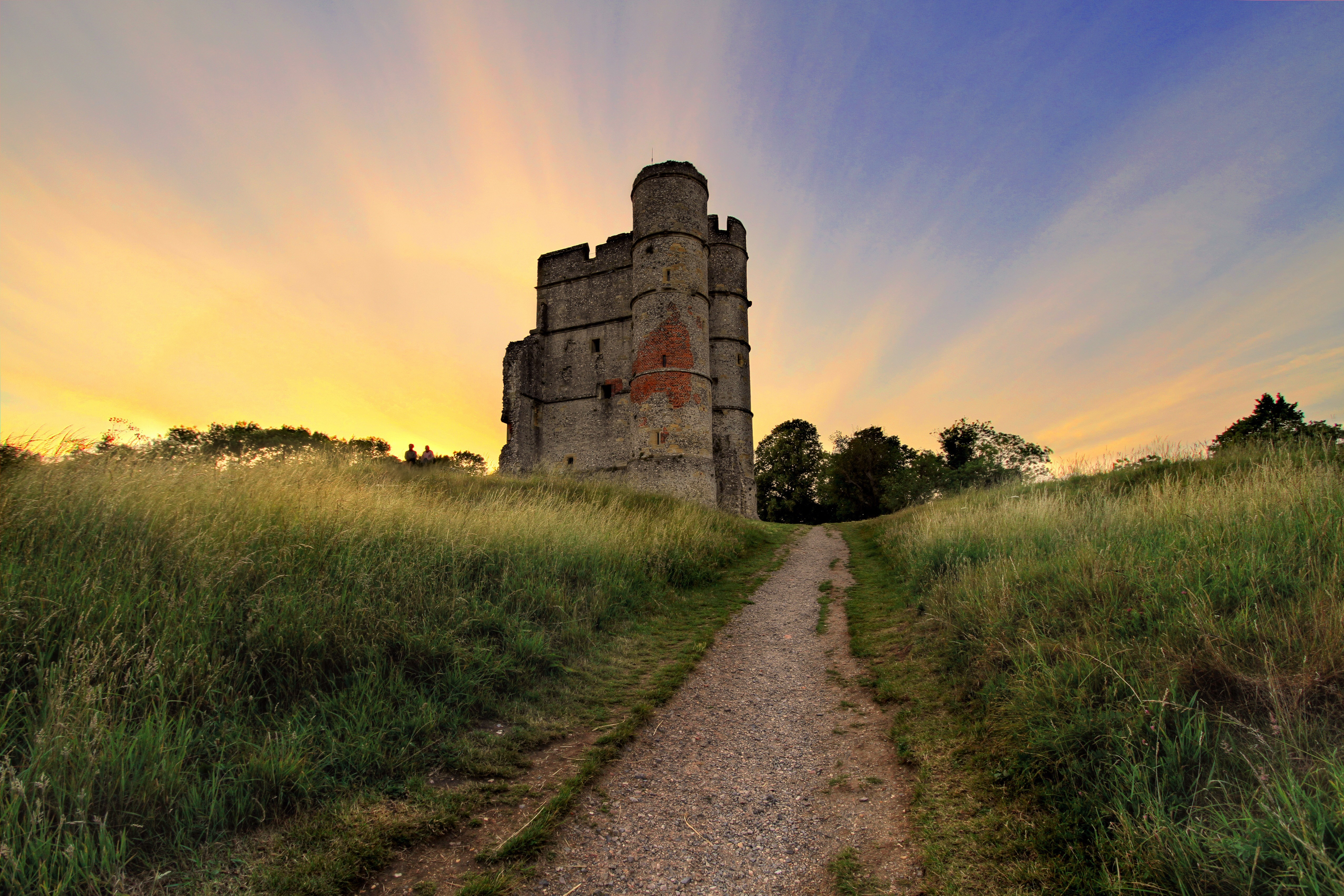
Donnington Castle 2020

The castle stayed in the Packer family until the mid 18th century, when Robert Packer married Mary Winchcombe, and the property passed to the Winchcombe family. From 1833 to 1881 the manor and castle was owned by Winchcombe Henry Hartley.

== Layout ==
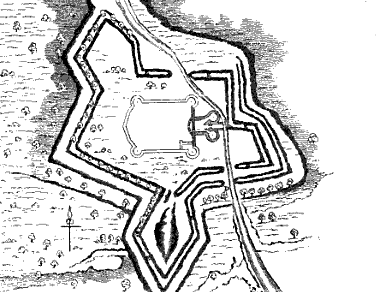
1825 plan showing the 14th-century Donnington Castle surrounded by the 17th-century star-shaped defences. The demolished parts of the castle are shown as unfilled lines, while the parts extant in 1825 are in thick black.

Donnington Castle was originally built in a roughly rectangular form, though the west facade projected outwards irregularly. It was enclosed by a curtain wall, with a round tower at each of the four corners. Roughly halfway along the two walls running from west to east were two square towers. The courtyard enclosed by the curtain walls would probably have contained a hall, kitchens, and accommodation for guests. Measured from the inner sides of the curtain walls, the courtyard measured 67 feet (20 m) north to south and 108 ft (33 m) east to west.

During the Civil War star-shaped defences were built around the castle to facilitate gun emplacements. Only the gatehouse, crested by battlements, survived the castle's destruction in 1646; standing three storeys high, it measures 17.5 by 11.75 feet (5.33 by 3.58 m) internally. Modern walls standing 0.5 metres (1 ft 8 in) high outline the original layout of the demolished castle. The star-shaped earthworks added during the Civil War are still visible, surviving to a height of 1.7 m (5 ft 7 in).

== Castle occupants ==
Donnington Castle's close association with the English monarchy dates back to its construction under a licence granted by Richard II to the Adderbury family. Although the castle changed hands several times, it eventually became the property of the royal family, and consequently, many notable figures closely linked to the English monarchy visited Donnington.

Among the most prominent residents of Donnington were Sir Richard Abberbury the Elder, the original owner of the castle and Chamberlain to Anne of Bohemia; Alice Chaucer, Duchess of Suffolk; William de la Pole, 1st Duke of Suffolk; Charles Brandon, 1st Duke of Suffolk and 1st Viscount Lisle; King Henry VIII; King Edward VI; Queen Elizabeth I; Elizabeth Cooke, Lady Russell; Charles Howard, 1st Earl of Nottingham; John Packer, Parliamentarian, and secretary to George Villiers, Duke of Buckingham; Sir John Boys, the Royalist Governor of Donnington Castle; and Robert Packer, a politician and Member of Parliament.

== Popular culture ==
Donnington Castle appears in the "Little Girl Lost" episode of The Saint, first broadcast on 2 December 1966.

The castle appeared in the Children's Film Foundation feature A Hitch in Time (1978), starring Patrick Troughton.

The twin-towered gatehouse is depicted on the cover of the Tenpole Tudor compilation album The Best of Tenpole Tudor: Swords of a Thousand Men (2001).

== Gallery ==
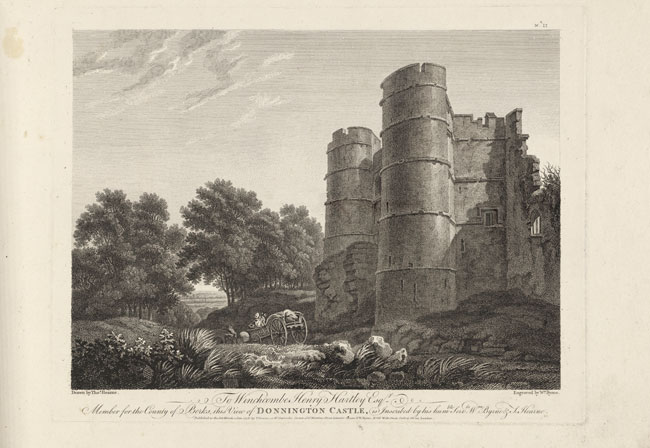
Print by William Byrne, 1778

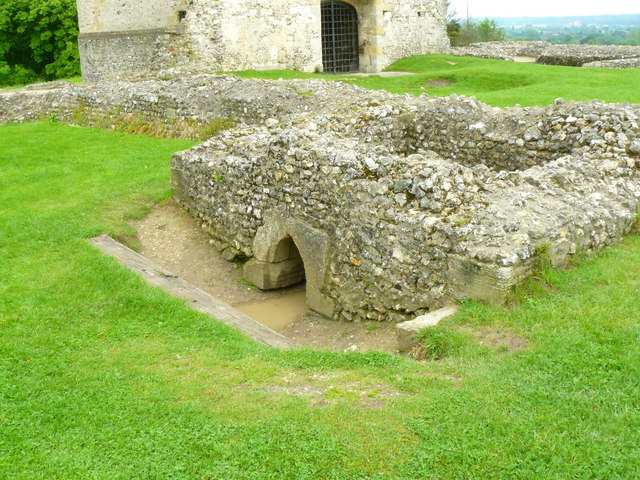
Waste disposal

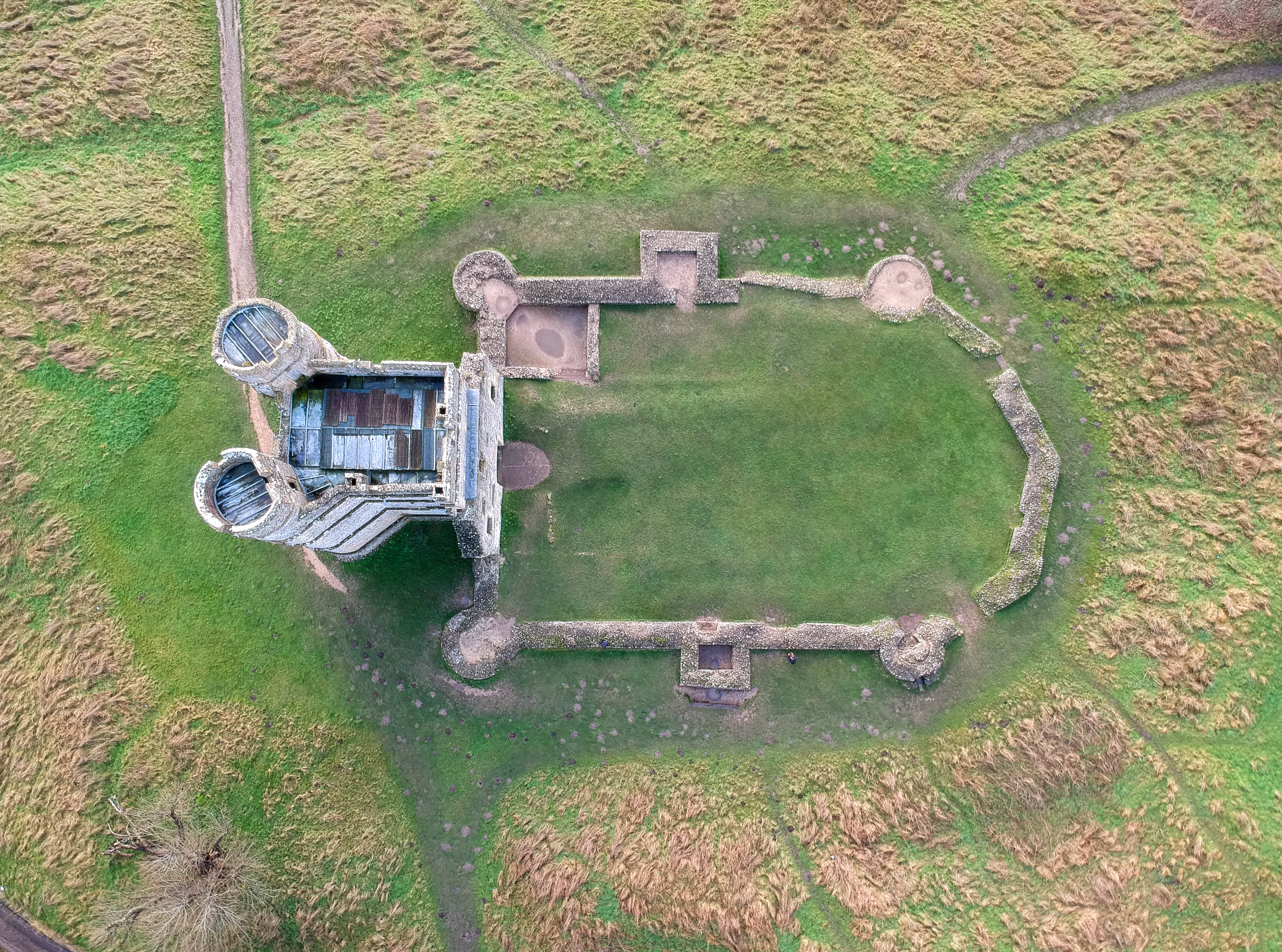
Aerial plan view photo of Donnington Castle, 2020

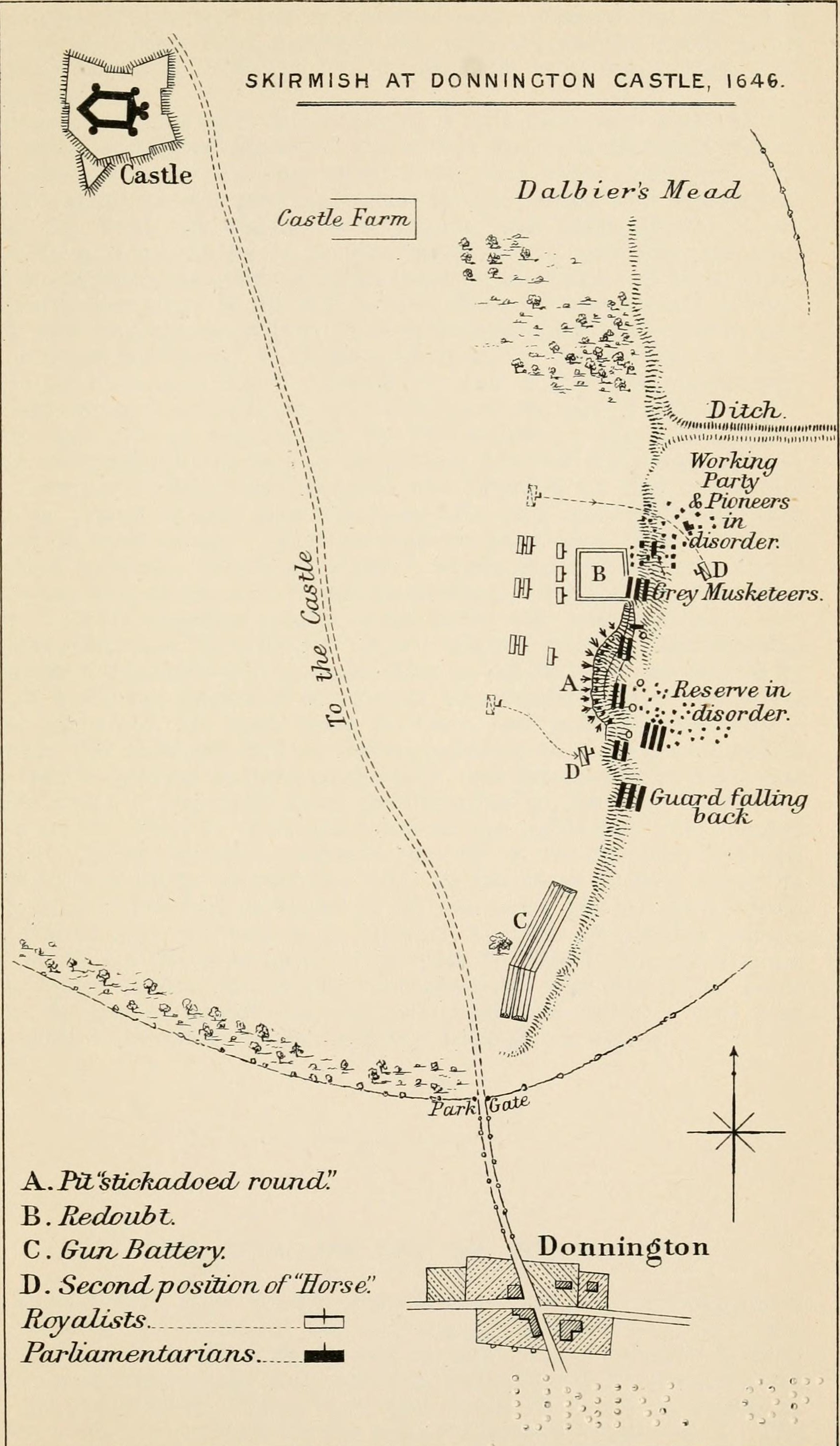
Plan of the last Skirmish at Donnington Castle during the First English Civil War

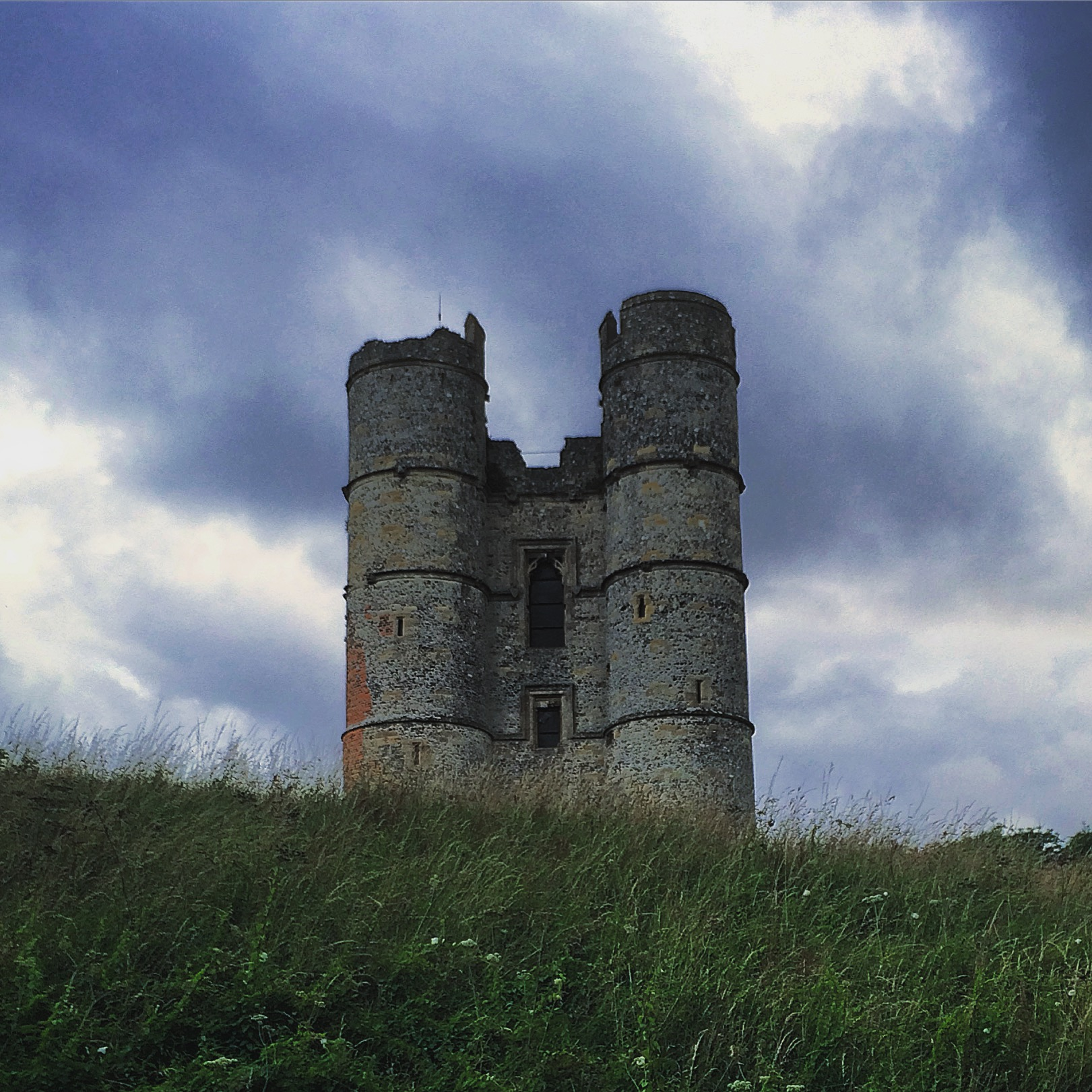
Distant view of the castle, 2017

== See also ==
- Castles in Great Britain and Ireland
- List of castles in England
