= Fixed–mobile convergence =

Fixed–mobile convergence (FMC) is an approach to telecommunications that uses a combination of fixed broadband and local access wireless technologies to create seamless services between fixed and mobile networks. Its adoption in the business sector reflects a broader trend towards more integrated and efficient communication systems.

== Defining "seamless services" ==
When used in relation to fixed-mobile convergence the term "seamless service" usually refers to "seamless handover", which means that a call in progress can move from the mobile (or cellular) network to the fixed network on the same phone without interruption. This is described by the carrier organisation Fixed Mobile Convergence Alliance (FMCA) in relation to consumer services: "Seamless is defined as there being no perceptible break in voice or data transmission due to handover (from the calling party or the called party's perspective)".

In this definition, "fixed broadband" means any connection to the Internet such as DSL, cable, or T1, and "local access wireless" means short-range wireless technologies that bridge the mobile device to the fixed network. For example, UK telecom BT's initial FMC service, BT Fusion, used Bluetooth rather than Wi-Fi for its local access wireless. Similarly, the deployment of picocells and femtocells allows cellular radio technology to serve as the local access link, while emerging technologies like Li-Fi use light waves to provide high-speed connectivity.

However the term "seamless services" can be ambiguous, with it sometimes being used to describe a state of service equivalence across any fixed or mobile termination point, for example where dialling plans are identical and there is no need for a change in dialled digits on a desk phone versus a mobile, resulting in what are called "network agnostic services".

This ambiguity in usage of the term was demonstrated when enterprise phone system providers Avaya and other PBX (business telephone systems) manufacturers announced their "Fixed Mobile Convergence" (FMC) initiative in 2005. In their case, what they were calling FMC was the ability of a PBX to treat a cell phone as an extension, and the ability for a cell phone to behave like a PBX extension phone. As they explained:

"... software seamlessly bridges office phone services to mobile devices, permitting the use of just one phone number and one voice mailbox. Client software extends the capabilities of the PBX to a mobile smartphone, creating a virtual desk extension."

This new definition of FMC differed from the FMCA definition in that it included neither local access wireless nor fixed broadband technology. The only defining characteristic it shared with the FCMA definition was seamless services, albeit without seamless handover.

== Business adoption ==
Fixed–mobile convergence has not developed as expected, allegedly because of a lack of demand. Even so, the adoption of FMC solutions by businesses can be seen to be driven by several factors in the modern business environment:

1. Enhanced Employee Productivity: Businesses can use FMC solutions to boost employee productivity by allowing them to use a single phone number and communication tool across both mobile and fixed networks. This simplifies their workflow and reduces the complexity of managing multiple communication channels.
2. Cost Efficiency: FMC solutions can lead to significant cost savings for businesses by integrating mobile and fixed communication systems, thereby reducing expenses associated with maintaining separate infrastructures.
3. Improved Customer Service: FMC's seamless handover capabilities and unified communication platforms can enhance customer service.
4. Integration with Cloud Services: Businesses can integrate FMC with cloud-based services, enhancing the flexibility and scalability of their communication systems and aligning with the broader trend towards cloud environments.
5. Support for Remote and Hybrid Work: FMC solutions are particularly advantageous for remote and hybrid work arrangements. By providing a seamless experience across various devices and networks, FMC helps employees can remain connected and productive regardless of their location.
6. Customization and Flexibility: Modern FMC solutions offer a high degree of customization and flexibility, allowing businesses to tailor their communication systems to meet specific needs and preferences.

Overall, the adoption of FMC solutions in the business sector reflects a broader trend towards more integrated and efficient communication systems, driven by the need for seamless connectivity and enhanced operational effectiveness.

== See also ==
- Quadruple play
- Technological convergence
