= FMCA =

FMCA may refer to:

- Family Motor Coach Association
- Fixed-Mobile Convergence Alliance
- Federal Magistrates Court
