= BT MyDonate =

Fundraising service provided by BT Group

- Type: Non-profit Subsidiary
- Industry: Telecommunications
- Founded: 6 April 2011
- Defunct: 30 June 2019
- Headquarters: BT Centre, London, EC1, United Kingdom
- Area served: United Kingdom
- Owner: BT Group
- Website: www.btplc.com/mydonate; www.bt.com/mydonate

BT MyDonate (simply MyDonate) was a not-for-profit online fundraising service provided by United Kingdom telecommunications company BT Group for charities in the UK, and was launched on 6 April 2011 as part of BT's investment to the community. It closed on 30 June 2019 so BT can focus its support in other areas including how they'll continue to support charities, and due to the many alternative fundraising platforms available, including several fee-free offers, to the UK.

The service passed on 100% of all donations made through the site to the charity, excluding credit/debit card charges and didn't charge a subscription fee or take commission. The service allowed people to register to give money to charity or collect fundraising donations. As of 31 December 2015, BT MyDonate reached over 8,750 charities, making it one of the most popular giving platforms in the UK.

== History ==
On 6 April 2011, BT Group launched the first online not-for-profit fundraising service for UK charities called BT MyDonate as part of its investment to the community. The service would pass on 100% of all donations made through the site to the charity, and unlike other services which took a proportion as commission and charged charities for using their services, BT would only pass on credit/debit card charges for each donation. The service allowed people to register to give money to charity or collect fundraising donations. BT developed MyDonate with the support of Cancer Research UK, Changing Faces, KidsOut, NSPCC and Women's Aid.

On 21 January 2019, BT announced it was closing the service on 30 June 2019 to focus its support in other areas including how they'll continue to support charities, and due to the many alternative fundraising platforms available, including several fee-free offers, to the UK.

BT said: "We’re really proud to have supported charities and fundraisers over many years. It’s been a tough decision to end MyDonate and we’re hugely grateful for the hard work and passion that people show in supporting great causes." It will assist charities affected by the closure and remained committed to investing in community initiatives, including helping people of all ages across the UK to develop essential technology skills and supporting national education programmes such as Barefoot.

== Operations ==
BT MyDonate was primarily available to UK charities in England, Wales, Scotland and Northern Ireland only. However, anyone outside of the UK could make a donation using BT MyDonate, although BT were only able to claim Gift Aid on the charity's behalf if they paid tax in the UK.

=== Gift Aid Processing ===
In the UK, donations by individuals are treated as being given after the deduction of income tax at the basic rate (20% in 2011), and charities can reclaim the basic rate income tax paid on the gift from HMRC via Gift Aid.

Charities on BT MyDonate could fill in the necessary legal forms to authorise BT to collect Gift Aid on their behalf for donations made to their charity, provided that they were registered with HMRC. If donors confirmed that they were UK taxpayers, they could add Gift Aid to their donation if their chosen charity has registered with HMRC, and if the charity had authorised BT to collect Gift Aid on their behalf, BT would collect the money from HMRC.

=== Fees ===
BT MyDonate was a not-for-profit online fundraising service and was free for charities to use as there were no set up, subscription or commission fees. Every penny of the money donated (excluding credit/debit card charges - 1.3% credit card, 15p debit card) was paid to the charity and BT could also collect Gift Aid on the charity's behalf to maximise their fundraising.

For a £10 donation, the charity received the following:

Donation	£10
Reclaim Tax (Gift Aid)	£2.50
Commission fee	£0.00
Credit Card Processing fee	£0.13
Debit Card Processing fee	£0.15
VAT	£0.00
Charity receives (Credit Card)	£12.37
Charity receives (Debit Card)	£12.35
