= Home Hub =

Home Hub may refer to:

- BT Smart Hub, wireless router
- Google Home Hub, a smart display

== See also ==
- Residential gateway – Device connecting users to the Internet
- Wireless router – Computer networking device
