= International Network Services Inc. =

International Network Services Inc. (INS) was a network architecture services provider based in Mountain View, California. Previously closely associated with Cisco, it was acquired by the former Lucent in 1999 for $3.7 bn. Following the collapse of the dot-com bubble, Lucent sold the unit back to employees and investors for an undisclosed sum. Then in 2007, INS was acquired by BT Group for £133 MM (now part of BT Advise Professional Services of BT (global services) based out of the US.
