= Ian Livingston, Baron Livingston of Parkhead =

British businessman (born 1964)

The Right Honourable The Lord Livingston of Parkhead
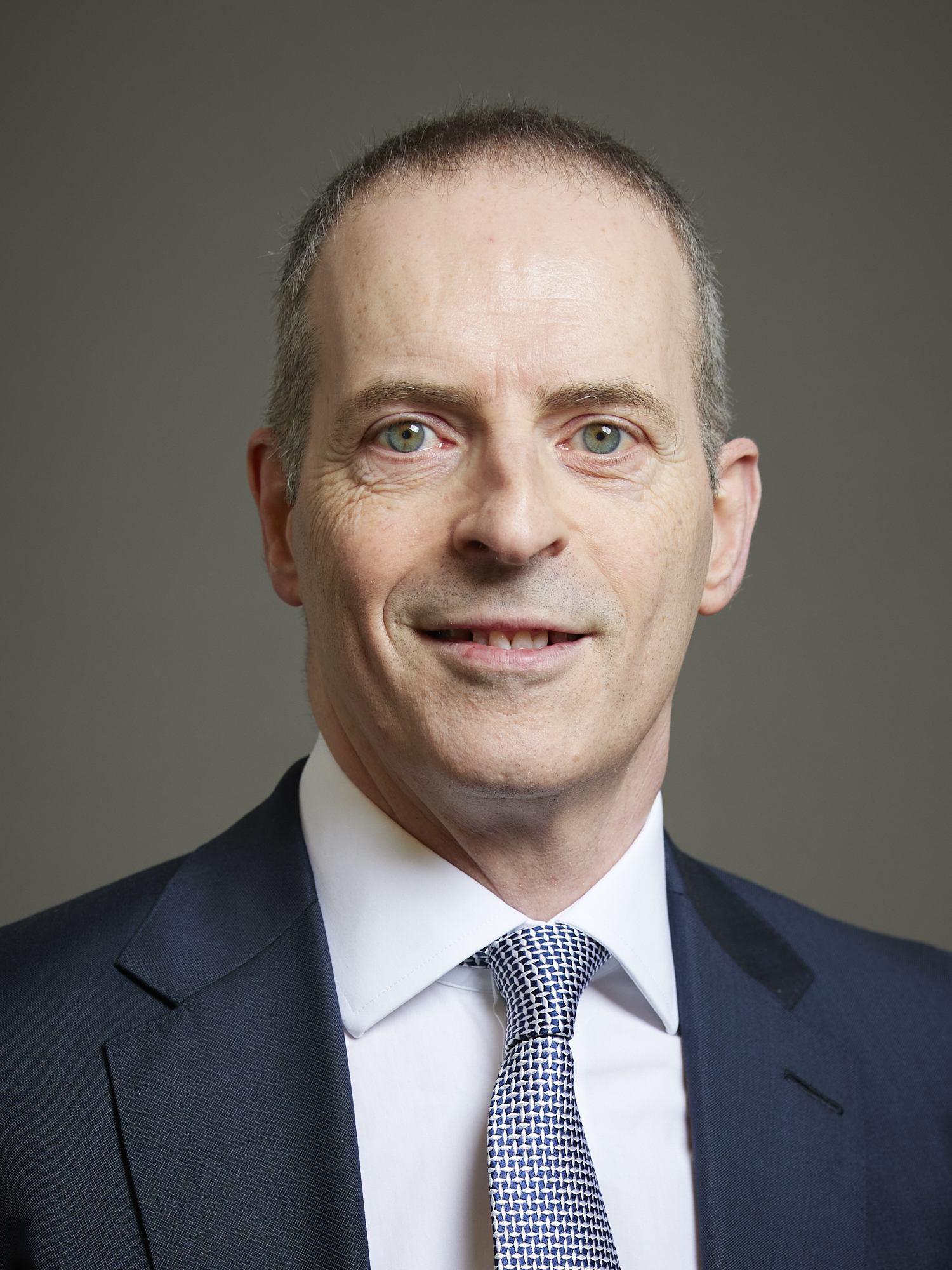
- Official portrait, 2023

Minister of State for Trade and Investment
- In office 11 December 2013 – 11 May 2015
- Prime Minister: David Cameron
- Preceded by: The Lord Green of Hurstpierpoint
- Succeeded by: The Lord Maude of Horsham

Member of the House of Lords
- Lord Temporal
- Life peerage 12 July 2013

Personal details
- Born: Ian Paul Livingston; 28 July 1964 (age 62) Glasgow, Scotland
- Party: Conservative
- Spouse: Deborah (m. 1989)
- Children: 2
- Education: University of Manchester
- Occupation: Politician
- Profession: Businessman

Ian Paul Livingston, Baron Livingston of Parkhead (born 28 July 1964), is a Scottish businessman who was formerly chief executive of BT Group. A Conservative member of the House of Lords, he previously served as the UK government's Minister of State for Trade and Investment. As of January 2025 he now serves as chairman of the board for financial services conglomerate S&P Global.

He was created a life peer on 15 July 2013 taking the title Baron Livingston of Parkhead.

== Early and personal life ==
The fourth generation son of Polish-Lithuanian Jews who arrived in Scotland 120 years ago, Livingston's family owned a factory making flying jackets and police uniforms. Livingston is the youngest of four children brought up in Kelvinside, his father was a general practitioner who practised medicine in Parkhead.

Livingston was educated at Hillhead Primary School before attending the independent Kelvinside Academy. He married his university contemporary, Deborah, in 1989. They live in Elstree, Hertfordshire and have two children (one son, one daughter).

== Career ==
After graduating with an economics degree from the University of Manchester at the age of 19, he trained as an accountant with Arthur Andersen, where, on assignment, he became the first chief accountant of The Independent newspaper. Livingston then moved to Bank of America, and then private equity firm 3i.

After being spotted by Sir Stanley Kalms, he moved to the corporate development department of Dixons Group in 1991, before becoming the youngest FTSE 100 finance director at the age of 32.

After the sale of Freeserve, Livingston joined BT Group as finance director, before he took up the post of CEO Retail, on 7 February 2005. He replaced Ben Verwaayen as Group CEO on 1 June 2008.

Livingston was a non-executive director of Celtic F.C., where he was appointed to the board on 1 October 2007. In 2015, after he voted for cutting tax credits, Celtic fans launched a petition to have him removed from the board. Livingston resigned from the board in June 2017.

Livingston became Chairman of Currys plc in August 2017 and he served in that role until September 2022.

In March 2025, it was announced that Livingston would replace Richard Thornburg as non executive chairman of the board for S&P Global effective May 7, 2025.

== Arms ==
Coat of arms of Ian Livingston, Baron Livingston of Parkhead

Notes
Granted by the Lord Lyon. Letters patent illuminated by Maggie Spalding.
Motto
More To Do

Business positions
| Preceded by Ben Verwaayen | Chief Executive of BT Group; 2008–2013 | Succeeded by Gavin Patterson |
Orders of precedence in the United Kingdom
| Preceded by The Lord Berkeley of Knighton | Gentlemen; Baron Livingston of Parkhead | Followed by The Lord King of Lothbury |
