= Sara Weller =

- Born: August 1961 (age 64)
- Occupation: Businesswoman
- Known for: Former CEO of Argos

Sara Vivienne Weller CBE (born August 1961) is a British businesswoman, non-executive director at Lloyds Banking Group and United Utilities, and was the managing director of the retail chain Argos from 2004 to 2011.

== Career ==
Weller has been a non-executive director of Lloyds Bank since February 2012, and chairs the Responsible Business Committee. She has chaired the Remuneration Committee at United Utilities since July 2012, and is a member of Council at Cambridge University.

From 2015 to 2017, Weller was chair of the Planning Inspectorate board.

In 2015, she was appointed a CBE for public service.

Between 2017 and 2023, she was the lead non-executive director of the Department for Work and Pensions.

Weller has been a non-executive director of BT Group since July 2020.
