= Merlin M4000 =

- Developer: Logica
- Type: Professional computer
- Operating system: CP/M-86, Concurrent DOS
- CPU: Intel 8086
- Memory: 768 KB KB (max)
- Display: Amber monochrome monitor
- Input: Keyboard
- Connectivity: ARCNET or Cambridge Ring LAN

The BT Merlin M4000 was a Personal computer sold by British Telecom during the 1980s as part of the Merlin range of electronic machinery for businesses. It was not developed by BT but was a rebadged Logica VTS-2300 Kennet, and a completely different machine from the Merlin Tonto which was a rebadged ICL OPD.

Merlin M4000 was designed as a general purpose computer but was not IBM PC compatible, and so could not run the major business applications around at the time as these were tied to the IBM PC hardware.

== Hardware ==
Merlin M4000 computers were packaged inside a substantial and heavy steel desktop case weighing approximately 12 kg. Inside the case was the main board, power supply, floppy and hard drives, and expansion cards. The design was reasonably modular as the case and main board were able to accommodate expansion cards and additional memory.

A separate keyboard with 114 keys connected to the main unit using a reversed British telephone plug with the clip on the left hand side. Most monitors were amber monochrome but later colour screens were sold.

An 8086 CPU was used. The maximum RAM was 768 KB, made up of 256 KB on the main board plus two additional 256 KB RAM cards.

A security socket was located on the rear of the main unit although it is unclear how it was used in practice.

Networking was accomplished using ARCNET or Cambridge Ring (computer network) LAN cards. An RS-232 optical fibre modem was also available.

The M4204T and M4213T computers were TEMPEST certified to BTR/01/202(4).

== Storage media ==
The M4204T had two internal 720 kB 5¼-inch floppy drives and the M4213T had one internal 720 kB 5¼-inch floppy drive and one internal hard drive with a capacity of either 10 MB or 20 MB. An external 76 MB hard drive and/or a 150 MB Tandberg QIC tape drive could also be connected to the M4000.

== Software ==
The CP/M-86 and Concurrent DOS operating systems were developed for Merlin M4000 computers. PC DOS and MS-DOS applications could not be run directly, but it was practical for vendors to cross-port their applications, if there was sufficient demand. WordStar was available and Prospero Pascal was a popular development platform.

Most Merlin M4000 computers were used to run bespoke software rather than off the shelf applications software. A few applications software packages were commercially available including:

- Lex9b word processor.
- MerlinWord word processor.
- A rather neat telephone directory / database program that was mainly used by switchboard operators.
- Software development tools including an 8086 assembler and COBOL compiler.
- An Asteroids game – initially as a demonstration of the bitmapped graphics.

== Usage ==
Merlin M4000 computers were commonplace in the United Kingdom during the 1980s, although most were sold to the public sector as large contracts as opposed to the private sector. Major customers included the Royal Navy as part of the OASIS II project, with sales of subsequent models as part of the Oasis 4 project, and the Department of Health and Social Security, with sales also being made to HM Customs and Excise and the Forestry Commission. Merlin M4000 computers were installed in DSS offices across the country where they were used for Case Paper location (tracking files as they moved from one room to another) and calculating benefits. Some M4000 computers were used internally by BT although it is not clear if they were ever used in conjunction with System X telephone exchanges. Many theatres in the UK used Merlin M4000 computers running the RITA booking software that was written either by or in conjunction with the Royal Shakespeare Company.

== Successor ==
The M4204T and M4213T computers were available in 1990 from the TEMPEST division of BT which sold TEMPEST certified computer equipment for high security applications. They were replaced by the M5000 range of IBM PC compatible TEMPEST certified computers running MS-DOS.
