= Fixed-Mobile Convergence Alliance =

The Fixed-Mobile Convergence Alliance, formed in mid-2004, was a global non-profit organisation for improving products for providing convergence between fixed and mobile networks. The FMCA was incorporated as a not-for-profit association under New York law in August 2006. The Alliance had a membership base of 20 leading global telecom operators, most of which were integrated telecom operators owning both fixed and mobile networks. The included vendor affiliation programme made the operators able to work closely with the associate members, who were all telecommunication vendors.

== Members ==
The alliance was founded by six companies: British Telecom, NTT, Rogers Wireless, Brasil Telecom, Korea Telecom and Swisscom. The purpose of this alliance was to encourage seamless integration of mobile and fixed telephone services (Technological convergence).

The member operators had a customer base of over 850 million customers and collaborated with member vendors towards accelerated development and availability of Convergence products and services in areas such as devices, access points and home gateways, roaming and innovative applications.

== Standards ==
In order to accomplish its goals, the FMCA developed close relationships with leading Standards Development, Specification and Certification Organisations (SDO/Fora), including the Wi-Fi Alliance, Wireless Broadband Alliance, Home Gateway Initiative and 3GPP. The FMCA actively contributed towards the delivery of existing and emerging standards that were relevant to FMCA product and service requirements. The FMCA did not aim to create standards but rather to accelerate the adoption of the Convergence technologies by encouraging consistency across product and equipment standards.

== Disbanding ==
The FMCA was disbanded in March 2010, allegedly because of lack of demand for its services.
