= Allison Kirkby =

British businesswoman

- Born: 1967 (age 58–59); Glasgow, Scotland
- Education: Glasgow Caledonian University (HND)
- Occupation: Businesswoman
- Known for: CEO of BT Group
- Predecessor: Philip Jansen
- Children: 2

Allison Kirkby (born 1967) is a British businesswoman who has been the chief executive of BT Group since February 2024. She had earlier led the Swedish telecoms companies Tele2 and Telia, and the Danish company TDC.

== Early life and education ==
Kirkby was born in Glasgow, Scotland in 1967, and grew up there. On leaving school, she worked as a trainee accountant in the Scotch whisky industry. She later earned a Higher National Diploma (HND) in accounting from Glasgow Caledonian University, and is a fellow of the Chartered Institute of Management Accountants (FCMA).

== Career ==
Kirkby qualified as a chartered management accountant in 1990 while working at Guinness. She worked at Procter & Gamble for 20 years before entering the telecoms industry with Virgin Media. She then led Tele2 and TDC Holding A/S from 2015 to 2020.

In 2019, she was appointed to the board of BT Group as a non-executive director. In 2020, Kirkby became chief executive of Telia Company, Sweden's largest telecoms provider of which 40% is owned by the state.

In August 2023, BT Group announced Kirkby's appointment as chief executive officer, to succeed Philip Jansen in February 2024 as the first woman to hold the position. As chief executive, Kirkby would be responsible for the £15 billion rollout of fibre broadband to 25 million homes by 2026 and the cutting of up to 55,000 jobs by 2030.

In March 2025, Kirkby was appointed as an unpaid adviser to the United Kingdom's Board of Trade for a 12-month term.

== Personal life ==
Kirkby is married with two children, a daughter and a son. She splits her time between homes in Stockholm, Sweden and Windsor, England.
