= Philip Jansen =

British businessman (born 1967)

- Born: 28 January 1967 (age 59); United Kingdom
- Education: University College Cardiff
- Occupation: Businessman
- Title: Ex-CEO, BT Group
- Term: February 2019 - January 2024
- Predecessor: Gavin Patterson
- Successor: Allison Kirkby
- Spouse: Married
- Children: 5

Philip Eric Rene Jansen (born January 1967) is a British businessman and the former chief executive of BT from February 2019 to January 2024. He has been the chair of WPP plc since September 2024.

== Early life ==
Jansen attended St George's College, Weybridge, and has a bachelor's degree in economics from University College Cardiff.

== Career ==
In 2010, Jansen joined Brakes Group as CEO, having been chief operations officer of Sodexo.

Following the Worldpay IPO in 2015 by its then private equity owners, Bain Capital and Advent International, Jansen was due to receive £50 million.

On 19 September 2018, Worldpay announced that Jansen would step down at the end of the year.

On 25 October 2018 he was announced as the new chief executive of BT with effect from 1 February 2019, succeeding Gavin Patterson.

During his tenure at BT Group, an industrial dispute began with the CWU due to pay and working conditions. This led to a strike ballot where 91.5% of BT, 95.8% of Openreach and 95.5% of EE CWU members who took part in the ballot voted to strike. During the dispute, some employees and commentators referred to him as “Foodbank Phil”.

In July 2023, it was announced that Jansen would be stepping down as chief executive of BT within the next 12 months.

In July 2024, Jansen was announced as the chair of WPP. He formally joined the company's board in September 2024.

== Personal life ==
Jansen is married, with five children, and lives in west London.

Business positions
Preceded by Gavin Patterson	Chief Executive of BT Group; 2019–2024	Succeeded by Allison Kirkby
