= Gavin Patterson =

British marketer (born 1967)

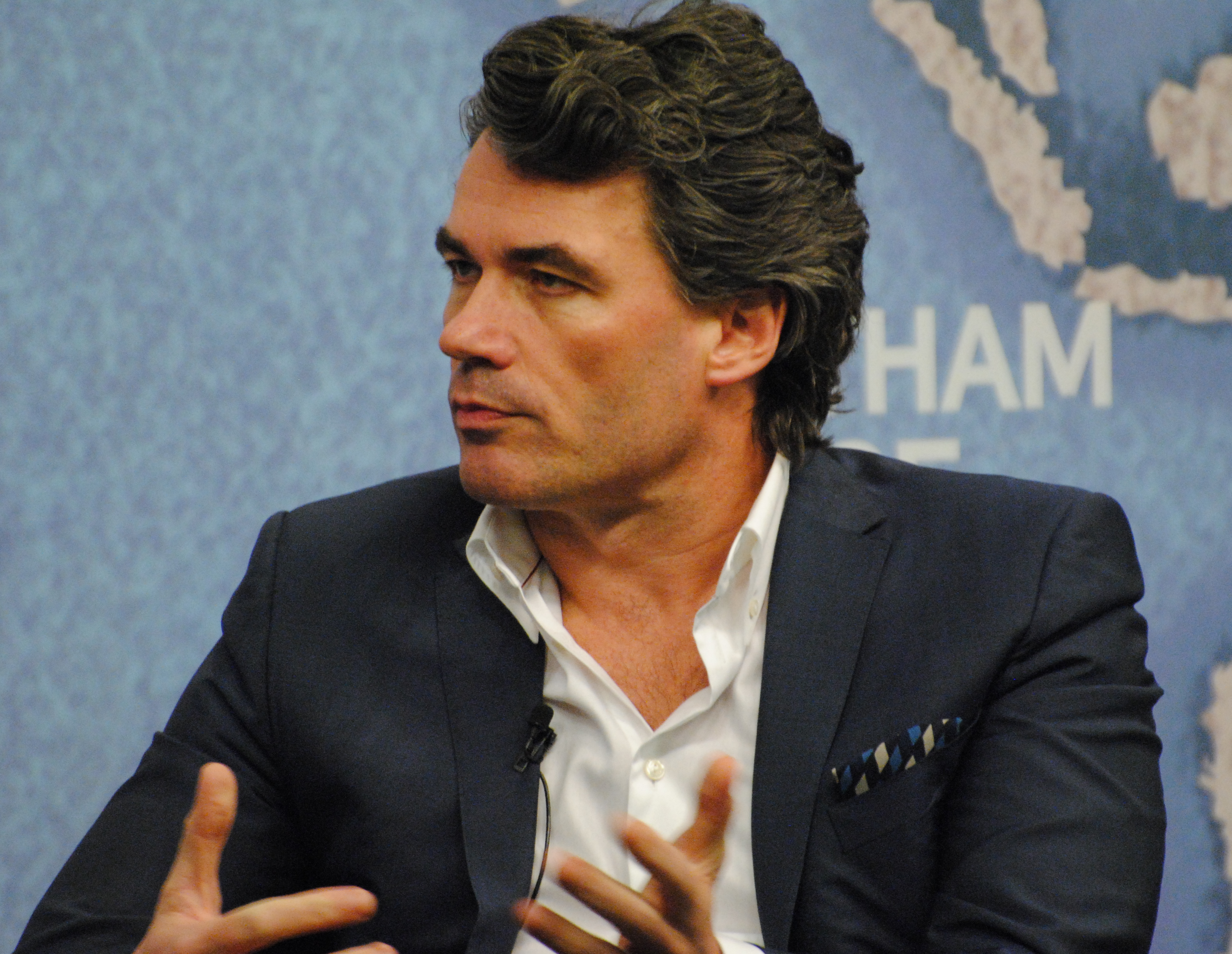
- Patterson in 2016
- Born: 6 September 1967 (age 59); Altrincham, England
- Education: Emmanuel College, Cambridge
- Occupation: Business executive
- Title: Chief Revenue Officer, Salesforce
- Spouse: Karen
- Children: 4

Gavin Patterson (born 6 September 1967) is a businessman who was President & Chief Revenue Officer of Salesforce and Chief Executive of BT Group from 2013–19.

== Early life ==
He was born in Altrincham, Cheshire, on 6 September 1967, and attended schools in Warrington and Yeovil. He graduated from Emmanuel College, Cambridge with a bachelor's degree in chemical engineering.

== Career ==
=== Early career ===
He was European head of marketing at Procter & Gamble for their Pantene line of hair products. In 2000, he joined the cable company Telewest, managing their television services. In 2004, he moved to BT to be the managing director of their consumer division. He launched BT Vision which provided on-demand TV and subsequently was responsible for their broadband offerings such as the optical fibre service, BT Infinity. At BT, his management style was a mix of relaxed, stylish marketing with aggressive cost-cutting. He was known for his flamboyant appearance of romantic black hair and open shirt collars. The previous chief executive, Ian Livingston, said of him, "...one button undone was fine, two was a bit racy, and three was Gavin." This marketing-executive style was novel and successful in the conservative corporate culture of BT and, as a high-flyer, he joined the board of BT in 2008.

=== BT ===
He was appointed chief executive of the BT Group in 2013 to replace Ian Livingston who was ennobled to join the government as Baron Livingston of Parkhead and Minister of State for Trade and Investment.

In August 2013, he was ranked as number 26 in the 2013 The Guardian's Media 100, his first appearance in the list. In December 2013, Computer Weekly ranked him as number 8 in its UKtech50 for 2013 .

He was BT's representative on the Confederation of British Industry (CBI)'s Climate Change Board, 2008-[2013], and joined the World Business Council for Sustainable Development (WBCSD)'s Executive Committee effective 1 January 2015, after the company joined in April 2014.

On 25 October 2018, it was announced that Philip Jansen, the outgoing CEO of Worldpay, would succeed him as CEO of BT, with effect from 1 February 2019, as "a change of leadership was needed".

=== Fractal Analytics ===
In November 2019, it was announced that Patterson had joined the board of directors for the artificial intelligence company Fractal Analytics.

=== Elixirr ===
In November 2019, Patterson had joined the board of directors for the Challenger Consultancy Elixirr as non-Executive Chairman.

Together with Founder and CEO, Stephen Newton, Patterson then led Elixirr to one of the most successful IPO's during the Covid 19 lockdown.

== Other interests ==
He is a fellow of the Marketing Society and a member of the Thirty Club for advertising professionals. He was appointed president of the Advertising Association in 2011. He is a non-executive director of British Airways, a trustee of the British Museum, and is on the board of Cambridge Judge Business School. He is a Non-Executive Director at British Airways, the APAX-backed AI business Fractal, and a Trustee of the British Museum.

== Personal life ==
His wife, Karen, is a fashion marketer who worked for Donna Karan. They have four children.

He has supported Liverpool Football Club since his early years in nearby Warrington.

Business positions
Preceded by Ian Livingston	Chief Executive of BT Group; 2013–2018	Succeeded by Philip Jansen
