= BT Fusion =

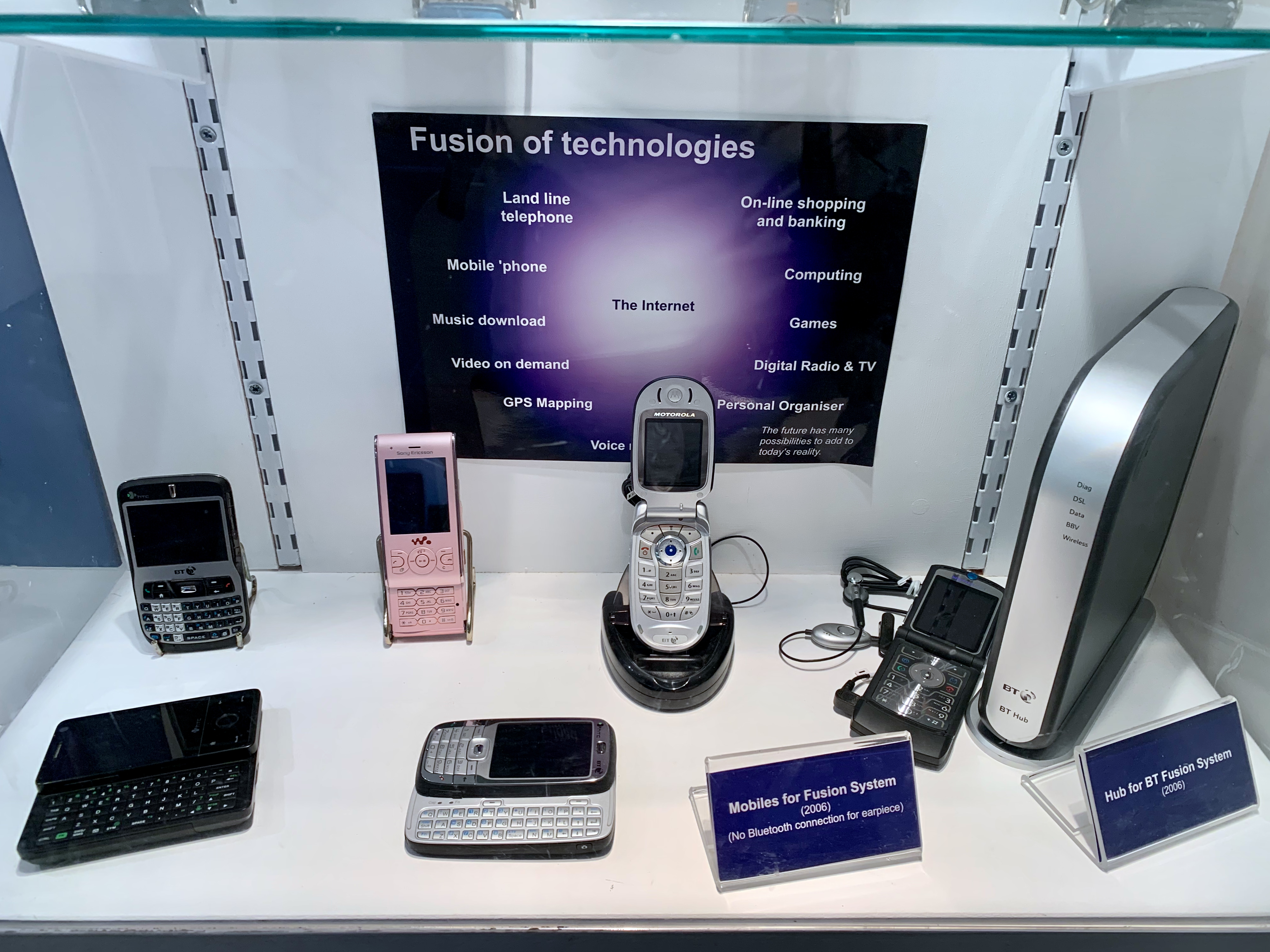
BT Fusion mobiles and home hub on display at Amberley Museum in West Sussex

BT Fusion was a telecommunications product available from BT Group in the United Kingdom until 1 April 2009 when it was withdrawn. It "fused" together mobile telephony and, from the user's point of view, conventional landline telephony. In fact, the fixed portion of the link was provided by a Voice over IP implementation using the domestic ADSL service. The BT Fusion service was compatible with the BT Smart Hub.

The premise of the service was that it could reduce mobile phone costs by not using the mobile network when the user is at home. The same phone was used (a modified version of the Motorola RAZR or Motorola V560), but if the phone was within range of a special base station installed in the user's home or office then incoming and outgoing calls will be routed through that base station instead of the mobile network. This link between the phone and base station was carried over Bluetooth (BT Fusion was latterly available using Wifi technology, thus allowing discounts not only at home but over BT Openzone WiFi hotspots). BT Fusion was an example of one type of telecommunication convergence.

From the base station, at-home calls were connected to the phone network using an ADSL broadband connection; only those with BT Broadband connections were eligible for the service. Voice over IP protocols were used to transmit the call, but this was intended to remain largely unnoticed from the user's point of view. In particular, the charges for calls made over the "home" part of a BT Fusion system were essentially the same as landline call charges.

Some commentators criticised the service as expensive and a "solution in search of a problem". In particular, they pointed to free or cheaper-than-landline IP phone systems like Skype.
