= BT Smart Hub =

Family of wireless residential gateway router modems distributed by BT

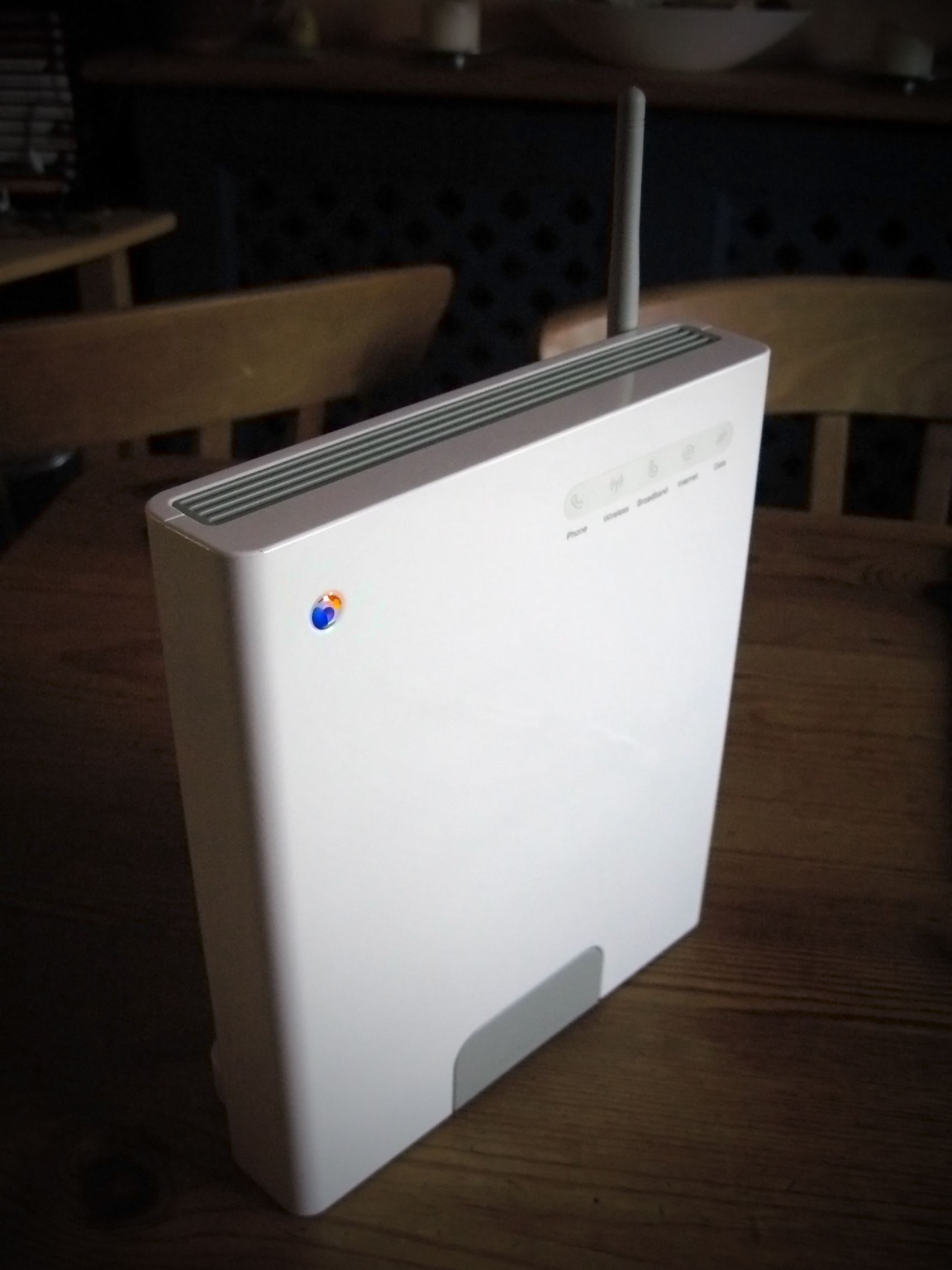
- BT Home Hub v1.0
- Manufacturer: Inventel; Technicolor; Gigaset/Sagem; Huawei
- Type: Wireless router IP Phone
- Released: 10 May 2013 (BT Home Hub 5)
- Introductory price: £129.99 (free on lease with BT Broadband)
- Operating system: Linux
- Storage: Optional external USB drive
- Connectivity: Home Hub 1.0 and 1.5 Wi-Fi (802.11 b/g); Fast Ethernet; USB 1.1; Home Hub 2.0; Wi-Fi (802.11 b/g/n); Fast Ethernet; USB 2.0; Home Hub 3 Wi-Fi (802.11 b/g/n); Fast Ethernet; Gigabit Ethernet; USB 2.0; Home Hub 4 Wi-Fi (802.11 a/b/g/n); Fast Ethernet; Gigabit Ethernet; USB 2.0; Home Hub 5 Wi-Fi (802.11 a/b/g/n/ac); Fast Ethernet; Four Gigabit Ethernet ports One USB 2.0 connector Smart Hub 1 and 2 Wi-Fi (802.11 a/b/g/n/ac); Fast Ethernet; Four Gigabit Ethernet ports One USB 3.0 connector
- Dimensions: Home Hub 2.0; 18.2 cm (7.2 in) (h); 17.5 cm (6.9 in) (w); 8.8 cm (3.5 in) (d) Home Hub 3; 11.0 cm (4.3 in) (h); 18.5 cm (7.3 in) (w); 4.0 cm (1.6 in) (d); Home Hub 4; 11.6 cm (4.6 in) (h); 23.6 cm (9.3 in) (w); 3.1 cm (1.2 in) (d) Home Hub 5; 11.6 cm (4.6 in) (h); 23.6 cm (9.3 in) (w); 3.1 cm (1.2 in) (d)
- Weight: 301g (BT Home Hub 5)

The BT Smart Hub (formerly BT Home Hub) is a family of wireless residential gateway router modems distributed by BT for use with their own products and services and those of wholesale resellers (i.e. LLUs) but not with other Internet services. Since v 5, Home/Smart Hubs support the faster Wi-Fi 802.11ac standard, in addition to the 802.11b/g/n standards. All models of the Home Hub prior to Home Hub 3 support VoIP Internet telephony via BT's Broadband Talk service, and are compatible with DECT telephone handsets. Since the Home Hub 4, all models have been dual-band (i.e. both 2.4 GHz and 5 GHz).

The BT Home Hub works with the now defunct BT Fusion service and with the BT Vision video on demand service. The BT Home Hub 1.0, 1.5 and 2.0 devices connect to the Internet using a standard ADSL connection. The BT Home Hub 3 and 4 models support PPPoA for ADSL and PPPoE for VDSL2, in conjunction with an Openreach-provided VDSL2 modem to support BT's FTTC network (BT Infinity). Version 5 of the Home Hub, released in August 2013, includes a VDSL2 modem for fibre optic connections. New firmware is pushed out to Home Hubs connected to the Internet automatically by BT.

The Home Hub 5 was followed on 20 June 2016 by the Smart Hub, a further development of the Home Hub, internally referred to as "Home Hub 6". It has more Wi-Fi antennas than its predecessor. It supports Wave 2 802.11ac Wi-Fi, found on review to be 50% faster than non-Wave 2. The Smart Hub was subsequently replaced with the Smart Hub 2 (Home Hub 6DX).

== History ==
Prior to release of the Home Hub (2004–2005), BT offered a product based on the 2Wire 1800HG, and manufactured by 2Wire. This was described as the "BT Wireless Hub 1800HG", or in some documentation as the "BT Wireless Home Hub 1800". This provided one USB connection, four Ethernet ports and Wi-Fi 802.11b or 802.11g wireless connection. A total of ten devices in any combination of these was supported.

The Home Hub 3B was manufactured by Huawei and also supports ADSL2+. The Home Hub 3B is powered by a highly integrated Broadcom BCM6361 System-on-a-chip (SoC). The BCM6361 has a 400 MHz dual MIPS32 core processor as well as an integrated DSL Analog Front End (AFE) and line driver, Gigabit Ethernet switch controller and 802.11 Wi-Fi transceiver.

== Features ==
The BT Home Hub 2.0 was a combined wireless router and phone. It supports the 802.11b/g/n wireless networking standards, and the WEP and WPA security protocols. It supports many of BT's services such as BT Fusion, BT Vision and BT Broadband Anywhere. It can also be used as a VOIP phone through BT Broadband Talk.

The BT Home Hub 3 incorporated WPS functionality, seen on other routers, which enables the user to connect to their encrypted network by the use of a "one touch" button, and also includes "smart wireless technology", which automatically chooses the wireless channel to give the strongest possible wireless signal. WPS has since been (temporarily) disabled by firmware updates due to security issues with the standard.

The BT Home Hub supports port forwarding.

The BT Home Hub versions 3, 4 and 5 may be used for access to files stored on an attached USB stick - USB 2.0 is supported. The server by default has the address File://192.168.1.254 and is available to the entire network.

The BT Smart Hub (initially branded Home Hub 6) upgraded the Wi-Fi provision to Wave 2 of the 802.11ac specification, and increased the number of antennae for improved MIMO.

The BT Ultra Smart Hub appeared visually similar to the Smart Hub, but featured a G.fast capable modem and included a BS6312 socket which subscribers to BT Digital Voice can use to attach an analogue telephone. Digital Voice launched in January 2020 as the replacement for analogue voice service, which was planned to be turned off by 2025.

The BT Smart Hub 2 provided the same technical features as the Ultra Smart Hub in a redesigned body, as well as supporting BT's "Complete Wi-Fi" mesh product.

=== Hub Phone ===
The BT Hub Phone is an optional handset that can be bought to work in conjunction with the BT Home Hub 1, 1.5, and 2.0. It calls using the BT Broadband Talk service, and may sit in a dock in the front of the Home Hub or be used on its own stand. It uses Hi-def sound technology when calls between Hub Phones are made. A DECT telephone may be used instead.

With each BT Home Hub released up to 2.0, a new phone model was made to accompany it:

- BT Home Hub 1.0: was supplied with the BT Hub Phone 1010
- BT Home Hub 1.5: was supplied with the BT Hub Phone 1020 (The only difference between the 1010 and the 1020 was the lack of the colour screen and supporting features on the 1020.)
- BT Home Hub 2.0: was supplied with the BT Hub Phone 2.1
- The BT Home Hub 3 and 4 do not work with the BT Broadband Talk service or DECT telephones. After 29 January 2011, BT Broadband Talk was no longer provided as part of BT's broadband packages.

The phones are only partially compatible with newer or older versions of the hub, able to make and receive calls, but with the loss of features including call waiting, call transfer, internal calls, phonebook, call lists and Hi-def sound.

=== Design ===
As of May 2026, the following versions of the BT Home/Smart Hub had been released:

- Version 0.5: grey (no Hub Phone was available, not technically a Home Hub but rather BT Fusion Hub)
- Version 1.0: white (matching Hub Phone was available)
- Version 1.5: white or black (matching Hub Phone was available)
- Version 2.0: black (matching black Hub Phone was available)
- Version 3.0: black (Hub Phones and DECT phones are not compatible) released on 29 January 2011.
- Version 4.0: black (Hub Phones and DECT phones are not compatible) released on 10 May 2013.
- Version 5.0 (HH5A/5B): black, released in mid-October 2013
- Smart Hub (Home Hub 6A /6B), mid-2016
- Smart Hub 2 (Home Hub 6DX), early 2019
- Smart Hub 3, 7 May 2026

There were two different versions of the BT Home Hub 2.0: v2.0A (2.0 Type A), manufactured by Thomson, and v2.0B (2.0 Type B), manufactured by Gigaset Communications (now Sagem Communications, Sagem having acquired Gigaset's broadband business in July 2009). Whilst the looks and functionality appear to be identical, the Home Hub 2.0A has been plagued with problems relating to poorly tested firmware upgrades which, amongst other problems, cause the Home Hub 2.0A to restart when uploading files using the wireless connection.

There are also two versions of the BT Home Hub 3: v3A (by Gigaset, now Sagem) and v3B, (Huawei).

The BT Home Hub can only be used with the BT Total Broadband package without modification; the 1.0, 1.5, 2A, 2B and 3A versions can be unlocked. The BT Home Hub configuration software is compatible with both Macintosh and Windows operating systems, although use of this is optional and computers without the BT software will still be able to connect to the Hub and browse the Internet normally.

The 4th generation of the BT Home Hub was released on 10 May 2013. It has been built with a smart dual-band technology, making it unique amongst other UK-based ISP-provided routers. The Home Hub 4 was supplied free of charge to new customers, with a £35 charge to existing customers. It has intelligent power management technology which monitors the hub functions and puts them individually into power-save mode when not in use. There two variants of the Hub 4, Type A and B.

The 5th generation Home Hub was released in mid-October 2013 and is an upgrade to the Home Hub 4, with Gigabit Ethernet connections, 802.11ac Wi-Fi (Wave 1) and an integrated VDSL modem. Customers upgrading from ADSL Broadband pay only a delivery charge; existing Broadband customers pay a £45 upgrade charge. There are two variants of the Hub 5, Type A with Lantiq chipset (ECI), and Type B with Broadcom. It is possible to replace the firmware of the Hub 5 Type A (and the identical 'Plusnet Hub One' and 'BT Business Hub 5' Type A) with OpenWrt, unlocking it from BT and providing the features of OpenWrt. In April 2018, scripts for modifying the stock firmware of a BT Hub 5 Type A to enable SSH access, were published on the GitHub repository; this enables access to the native OpenRG command-line interface.

== Models and technical specifications ==
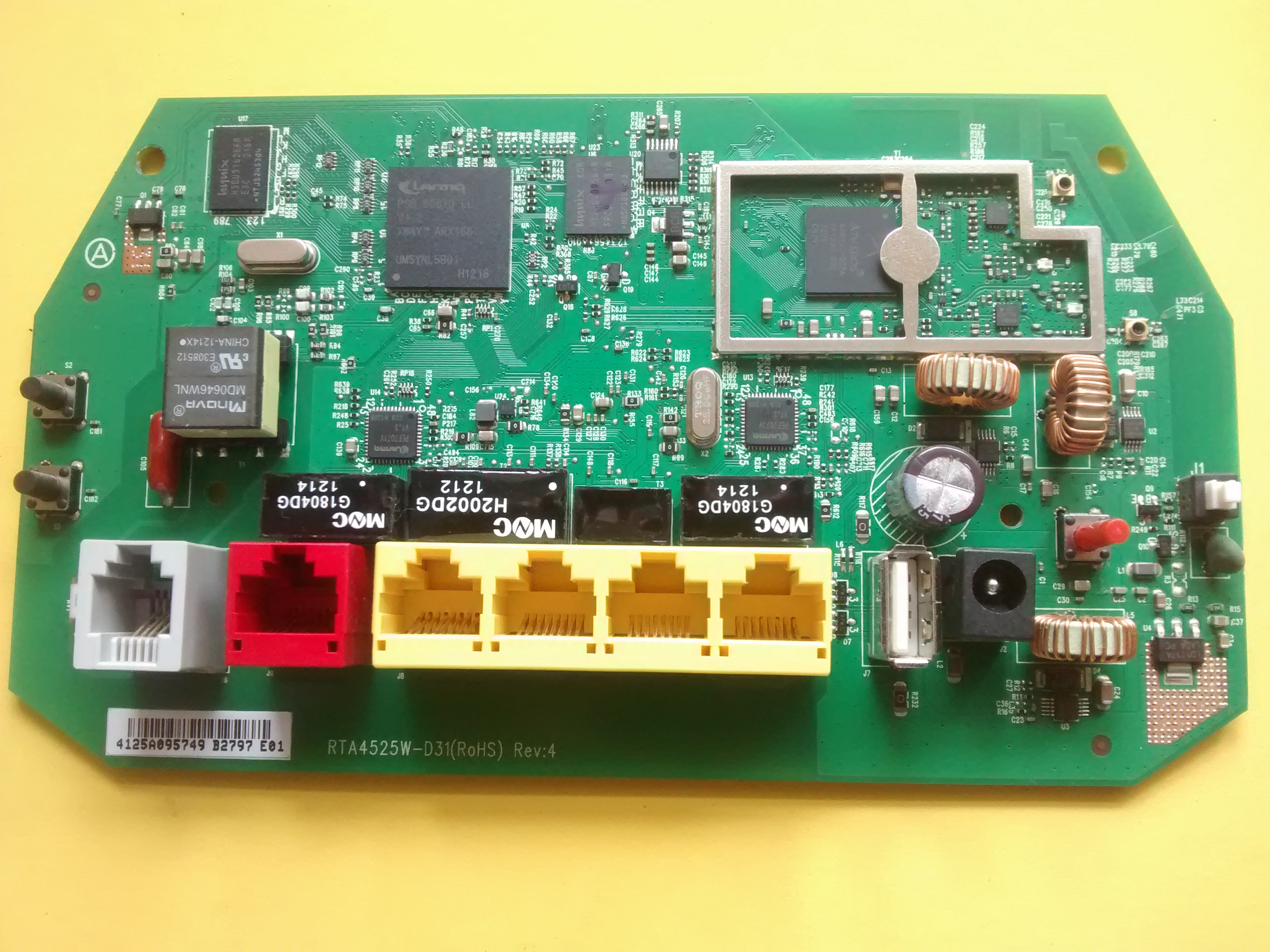
The rear of the circuit board from a BT Home Hub 3.0 Type A

The BT Home Hub package includes:

- Broadband cable (RJ11 to RJ11)
- Ethernet cable (RJ45 to RJ45) (Cat5e)
- Power adapter
- 2× ADSL microfilters
- Phone to RJ11 converter
- User guide and CD

A USB lead was provided with the Home Hub 1 only.

Spec	BT Home Hub 1.0/1.5	BT Home Hub 2.0	BT Home Hub 3	BT Home Hub 4	BT Home Hub 5	BT Smart Hub	BT Smart Hub 2	BT Smart Hub 3
Modem	ADSL2+	ADSL2+	ADSL2+ (PPPoE is also supported in firmware for VDSL2)		ADSL2+ and VDSL2	ADSL2+ and VDSL2	ADSL2+, VDSL2, G.fast	
Wi-Fi	802.11 b/g	802.11 b/g/n	802.11 b/g/n (now with "Smart Wireless", explained above)	2.4 GHz: 802.11n dual-stream 2×2 MIMO. Back compatible with 802.11 b/g. 5 GHz: 802.11n dual-stream 2×2 MIMO. Back compatible with 802.11a.	2.4 GHz: 802.11 b/g/n 2×2 MIMO; 5 GHz: 802.11 a/n/ac 3×3 MIMO (802.11ac Wave 1)	2.4 GHz: 802.11 b/g/n/ac 3×3 MIMO; 5 GHz: 802.11 a/n/ac 4×4 MIMO (802.11ac Wave 2)	2.4 GHz: 802.11 b/g/n/ac 3×3 MIMO; 5 GHz: 802.11 a/n/ac 4×4 MIMO (802.11ac Wave 2)	WiFi 6 Dual band 2.4GHz 3x3 MIMO; 5GHz 4x4 MIMO
Wireless; Security	WEP and WPA-PSK/WPA2-PSK/RADIUS		All previous features but now with WPS (temporarily disabled in firmware updates)	2.4 GHz: WPA & WPA2 (default), WPA, WPA2 and WEP 64/40; 5 GHz: WPA2	WPA (2.4 GHz only), WPA2, WPS			
Ports	2× Ethernet 10/100 Mbit/s sockets 1× USB 1.1 socket 2× RJ11 (broadband in and phone)	4× 10/100 Mbit/s Ethernet sockets (RJ45); 1× USB (for network drives); 1x Broadband in (RJ11); 1× Telephone socket	3× 10/100 Mbit/s Ethernet sockets (RJ45); 1× 10/100/1000 Mbit/s GigE Ethernet socket (RJ45); 1× USB socket (now enabled for use); 1× BT Infinity in (RJ45); 1× ADSL Broadband in (RJ11)		4× 10/100/1000 Mbit/s GigE Ethernet socket (RJ45); 1× USB socket 1× BT Infinity in (RJ45); 1× VDSL Broadband in (RJ11)	4x 10/100/1000 Mbit/s GigE Ethernet sockets (RJ45); 1x USB 2.0 socket 1x VDSL Broadband in (RJ11)	4x 10/100/1000 Mbit/s GigE Ethernet sockets (RJ45); 1x USB 2.0 socket 1x VDSL Broadband in (RJ11); 1× Telephone socket	4 x 1Gbps LAN, 1 x 2.5Gbps WAN 1x USB socket 1x VDSL Broadband in (RJ11) 1× Telephone socket
Dimensions (w × d × h)	19.5 × 3.9 × 22.5 cm	17.5 × 8.8 × 18.2 cm	18.5 × 4 × 11 cm	23.6 × 3.1 × 11.6 cm				
Software	6.2.6.E or 6.2.6.H	8.1.H.U (Type A), 4.7.5.1.83.3.37 (Type B)	4.7.5.1.83.8.94.1.37 (Type A), V100R001C01B036SP05_L_B (Type B)	4.7.5.1.83.8.130.1.26 (Type A), FW:V0.07.01.0910-BT (Type B)	4.7.5.1.83.8.236.1.2 (Type A), V0.07.03.814 (Type B)	SG4B1000B540, SG4B1000E016, SG4B1000E020, SG4B1000E077, SG4B1000E079, SG4B1000E081 (Type A)		

== Reported issues ==
The security of older BT Home Hub has been questioned

In May 2017, it was reported that many BT Smart Hub customers were suffering problems with the router constantly rebooting and being unable to maintain a reliable internet connection.

In May 2021, it was reported that the "BT Smart Hub 2 router [was] causing connection issues between their Wi-Fi-enabled devices".

The telecom giant's router operates using two different wireless frequencies: 2.4Ghz and 5Ghz. Users were complaining that any devices not linked to the same frequency, such as a phone and a speaker, were refusing to communicate with each other.
