= BT Group =

British multinational telecommunications holding company

BT Group plc
- Logo since 2022
- Formerly: British Telecommunications plc (1984–2001)
- Type: Public
- Traded as: LSE: BT.A; FTSE 100 component
- Industry: Telecommunications
- Predecessor: Electric Telegraph Company; General Post Office; Post Office Telecommunications
- Founded: 18 June 1846; 180 years ago (foundation of the Electric Telegraph Company); 1 January 1912; 114 years ago (National Telephone Company system take-over under the General Post Office); 1 October 1969; 57 years ago (as a public corporation under the Post Office); 1 October 1981; 45 years ago (as a public corporation under the British Telecom brand); 1 April 1984; 42 years ago (as a private company)
- Headquarters: London, England, UK
- Area served: Worldwide
- Key people: Adam Crozier (chairman); Allison Kirkby (Chief Executive); Simon Lowth (Group Finance Director)
- Products: Fixed-line telephony; Mobile telephony; Broadband internet; Fibre-optic communication; Digital television; IT and network services; Home security; Telecommunications equipment
- Revenue: ▼£19.646 billion (2026)
- Operating income: ▲£3.355 billion (2026)
- Net income: ▲£1.077 billion (2026)
- Owner: Bharti Enterprises (24.5%); Deutsche Telekom (12%); Carlos Slim (3.2%)
- Number of employees: 100,000 (2026)
- Divisions: BT Business; BT Consumer; BT Digital; BT Networks
- Subsidiaries: BT Ireland; EE; Openreach; Plusnet; TalkTalk Group
- Website: bt.com

BT Group plc (formerly British Telecom), trading as BT, is a British multinational telecommunications holding company headquartered in London, England. It has operations in around 180 countries and is the largest provider of fixed-line, broadband and mobile services in the UK, and also provides subscription television and IT services.

BT's origins date back to the founding in 1846 of the Electric Telegraph Company, the world's first public telegraph company, which developed a nationwide communications network. BT Group as it came to be started in 1912, when the General Post Office, a government department, took over the system of the National Telephone Company, becoming the monopoly telecoms supplier in the UK. The Post Office Act of 1969 led to the GPO becoming a public corporation, Post Office Telecommunications.

The British Telecom brand was introduced in 1980, and became independent of the Post Office in 1981, officially trading under the name. British Telecom was privatised in 1984, becoming British Telecommunications plc, with some 50 percent of its shares sold to investors. The Government sold its remaining stake in further share sales in 1991 and 1993. BT holds a royal warrant and has a primary listing on the London Stock Exchange, and is a constituent of the FTSE 100 Index. BT controls a number of large subsidiaries. Its BT Business division supplies telecoms services to corporate and government customers worldwide, and its BT Consumer division supplies telephony, broadband, and subscription television services in the UK to around 18 million customers.

== History ==
=== Electrical telegraphy ===
A number of privately owned electrical telegraph companies operated in the United Kingdom of Great Britain and Ireland from 1846 onwards. Among them were:

- Electric Telegraph Company, the world's first public telegraph company, which developed a nationwide communications network
- British and Irish Magnetic Telegraph Company
- British Telegraph Company
- London District Telegraph Company
- United Kingdom Telegraph Company

=== General Post Office ===
The Telegraph Act 1868 passed control of all these to the Postal Telegraphs Department of the newly formed General Post Office (GPO). The Telegraph Act 1869 granted the GPO a monopoly over communications. With the invention of the telephone by Alexander Graham Bell in 1876, the GPO began to provide telephone services from some of its telegraph exchanges. It was confirmed in 1880 that the 1869 Act included telephony even though the telephone had not been invented when the Act was first conceived.

In 1882, the Postmaster-General Henry Fawcett started to issue licences to operate a telephone service to private businesses and the telephone system grew under the GPO in some areas and private ownership in others. The GPO's main competitor, the National Telephone Company (NTC), emerged in this market by absorbing other private telephone companies. It controlled most of telephony in Britain before the 1880 ruling on the Telegraph Act 1869 mandated a nationalised service – which was instated in 1911 prior to the absorption of the NTC into the GPO in 1912.

The trunk network was unified under GPO control in 1896 and the local distribution network in 1912. A few municipally owned services remained outside of GPO control. These were Kingston upon Hull, Portsmouth and Guernsey. Hull still retains an independent operator, Kingston Communications, though it is no longer municipally controlled. Assets of the National Telephone Company were acquired by the UK Government to form Post Office Telephones in late 1911. Post Office engineers in the inter-war period had considerable expertise in both telecommunications and hearing assistive devices. Transistors were invented by Bell Telephone Laboratories in the US in 1948; however, it was not until the mid-1960s that a transistorised oscillator was introduced to make the calling sound on a telephone in the UK.

=== Post Office Telecommunications ===
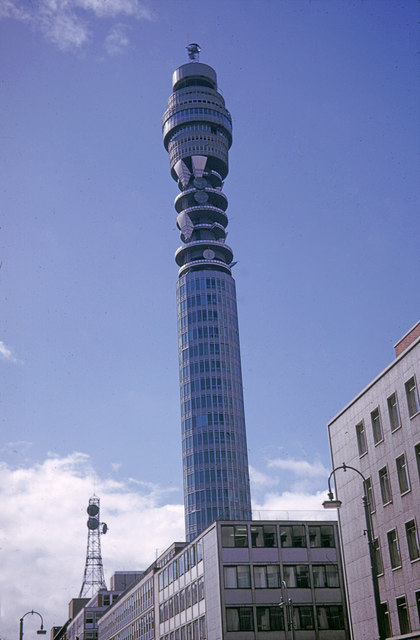
The BT Tower, then known as the Post Office Tower, 1966 (shortly after construction)

In 1969, the GPO, a government department, became the Post Office, a nationalised industry separate from government. Post Office Telecommunications was set up as a division of the Post Office in October 1969. The Post Office Act 1969 was passed to provide for greater efficiency in post and telephone services; rather than run a range of services, each organisation would be able to focus on their respective service, with dedicated management. By law, the Post Office retained the exclusive right to operate the UK national telecom network (although, since 1914 had licensed Hull City Council to operate its own local telephone network, Kingston Communications).

The 1970s was a period of great expansion for the Post Office. Most exchanges were modernised and expanded, and many services, such as STD and international dialling were extended. By the early 1970s, subscribers in most cities could dial direct to Western Europe, the US, and Canada; by the end of the decade, most of the world could be dialled direct, and the Post Office had launched Confravision, an early videoconferencing system linking studios in multiple cities. The System X digital switching platform was developed, and the first digital exchanges began to be installed. The Post Office also procured their own fleet of vans, based on the Commer FC model. Post Office Telecommunications researched and implemented data communications using packet switching in the 1970s, resulting in the EPSS, International Packet Switched Service, and Packet Switch Stream.

=== British Telecom ===
British Telecom logo used from 1980 to 1991

In 1979, the Conservatives decided that telecommunications should be fully separated from the Post Office. Hence, the British Telecom brand was introduced in 1980. On 1 October 1981, this became the official name of Post Office Telecommunications, which became a state-owned corporation independent of the Post Office under the provisions of the British Telecommunications Act 1981. In 1982, BT's monopoly on telecommunications was broken with the granting of a licence to Mercury Communications.

=== Privatisation ===
On 19 July 1982, the Government announced its intention to sell shares in British Telecom to the public. On 1 April 1984, British Telecommunications was incorporated as a public limited company (plc) in anticipation of the passing of the Telecommunications Bill. This Bill received royal assent on 12 April as the Telecommunications Act 1984, and the transfer to British Telecommunications plc from British Telecom as a statutory corporation of its business, its property, its rights and liabilities took place on 6 August 1984. The remainder of the statutory corporation British Telecom was dissolved in 1994.

Initially, all shares in the new plc were owned by the Government. In November 1984, 50.2% of the new company was offered for sale to the public and employees. Shares were listed in London, New York, and Toronto, and the first day of trading on was 3 December 1984. The Government sold half its remaining interest in December 1991 and the other half in July 1993. In July 1997, the new Labour Government relinquished its Special Share ("Golden Share"), retained at the time of the flotation, which had effectively given it the power to block a takeover of the company, and to appoint two non-executive directors to the Board. The company changed its trading name to "BT" on 2 April 1991. In 1996, Peter Bonfield was appointed CEO and chairman of the executive committee, promising a "rollercoaster ride".

=== Diversification ===
In the early 1980s, BT Merlin was established as a business unit of British Telecom, at first to sell products such as phone systems to small businesses. In 1983, the growing "office automation" market was addressed through Merlin-branded desktop computers made by ICL, with built-in modems to communicate over the phone network. Later products included the Merlin Tonto – developed by ICL from the Sinclair QL home computer – and the Merlin M4000, a rebadged Logica computer.

In the 1990s, BT entered the Irish telecommunications market through a joint venture with the Electricity Supply Board, the Irish state-owned power provider. This venture, entitled Ocean, found its main success through the launch of Ireland's first subscription-free dial-up ISP, oceanfree.net. As a telecoms company, it found much less success, mainly targeting corporate customers. BT acquired 100% of this venture in 1999. Over the period of 1980 to 2000, BT and other providers adopted Internet product strategies when it became commercially advantageous.

=== Attempted global alliances ===
==== MCI ====
In June 1994, BT and MCI Communications launched Concert Communications Services, which was a $1 billion joint venture between the two companies. Its aim was to build a network that would provide easy global connectivity to multinational corporations. This alliance progressed further on 3 November 1996 when the two companies announced that they had agreed to a merger, creating a global telecommunications company called Concert plc. The proposal gained approval from the European Commission, the US Department of Justice, and the US Federal Communications Commission and looked set to proceed.

In light of pressure from investors reacting to the slide in BT's share price on the London Stock Exchange, BT reduced its bid price for MCI, releasing MCI from its exclusivity clause and allowing it to speak to other interested parties. On 1 October 1997, Worldcom made a rival bid for MCI which was followed by a counter-bid from GTE. BT sold its stake in MCI to Worldcom in 1998 for £4,159 million. As part of the deal, BT also bought out from MCI its 24.9% interest in Concert Communications, thereby making Concert a wholly-owned part of BT. The reaction to the failure of the deal in the City of London was critical of then Chairman Iain Vallance and CEO Peter Bonfield, and the lack of confidence from the failed merger led to their removal.

==== AT&T ====
In 1994, as the BT-owned Concert still wanted access to the North American market, it needed a new partner. An AT&T/BT option had been mooted in the past, but stopped on regulatory grounds due to their individual virtual monopolies in their home markets. By 1996, this had receded to the point where a deal was possible, and a deal was consummated in 1998. At its height, the Concert managed network was extensive. Although Concert continued signing customers, its rate of revenue growth slowed, so that in 1999 David Dorman was made CEO with a brief to revive it.

In late 2000, the BT and AT&T boards fell-out, partly due to each partner's excess debt and the resulting board room clear-outs, partly due to Concert's extensive annual losses. AT&T recognized that Concert was a threat to its ambitions if left intact, and so negotiated a deal where Concert was split in two in 2001: North America and Eastern Asia went to AT&T, the rest of the world and $400M to BT. BT's remaining Concert assets were merged into its BT Ignite, later BT Global Services group.

=== BT Ireland ===
In 2000, BT acquired Esat Telecom Group plc, and all its subsidiary companies, and Ireland On Line. It also purchased Telenor's minority shareholding in Esat Digifone. The Esat Telecom Group was split in two with the landline and internet operations were combining with Ocean to become part of BT Ignite. Esat Group was renamed Esat BT in July 2002, and eventually BT Ireland in April 2005. Esat Digifone became part of BT Wireless, before being spun off into a separate independent company mmo2 plc (now Telefónica Europe). EsatBT installed the first DSL lines in Ireland, to try and compete heavily with former state telecoms company Eircom and operate one exchange, in Limerick.

=== 2001 debt crisis, sale, and demerger ===
By 2001, BT had a debt of £30 billion, much of which was acquired during the bidding round for the 3rd generation mobile telephony (commonly known as 3G) licences. It had also failed in its series of proposed global mergers, and the funds flowing from its then virtual monopoly of the UK market place had been largely removed. It was also headed by two executives who had little support from the London Stock Exchange, particularly in light of a 60% drop in share price in sixteen months.

Philip Hampton joined as CFO, and in April 2001 Sir Iain Vallance was replaced as chairman by recognised turn around expert Sir Christopher Bland. In May 2001, BT carried out corporate Europe's largest ever rights issue, allowing it to raise £5.9 billion. A few days before, it sold stakes in Japan Telecom, in mobile operator J-Phone Communications, and in Airtel of India to Vodafone. In June 2001, BT's directory business was sold as Yell Group to a combination of private equity firms Apax Partners and Hicks, Muse, Tate & Furst for £2.1 billion.

A demerger followed in November 2001, when the former mobile telecommunications business of BT, BT Cellnet, was hived off as a separate business named "mmO2". This included BT owned or operated networks in other countries, including BT Cellnet (UK), Esat Digifone (Ireland), and Viag Interkom (Germany). All networks now owned or operated by mmO2 (except Manx Telecom) were renamed as O2. The de-merger was accomplished via a share-swap, all British Telecommunications plc shareholders received one mmO2 plc and one BT Group plc (of which British Telecommunications is now a wholly owned subsidiary) share for each share they owned. British Telecommunications plc was de-listed on 16 November, and the two new companies started trading on 19 November.

=== Aftermath, 2001 to 2006 ===
At the end of the series of sales, Sir Peter Bonfield resigned in October 2001. Bonfield was replaced by former Lucent CEO Ben Verwaayen. During Bonfield's tenure the share price went from £4 to £15, and back again to £5. Bonfield's salary to 31 March 2001 was a basic of £780,000 (increasing to £820,000) plus a £481,000 bonus and £50,000 of other benefits including pension. He also received a deferred bonus, payable in shares three years' later, of £481,000, and additional bonuses of £3.3 million. mmO2 plc was replaced by O2 plc in a further share-swap in 2005, and subsequently bought in an agreed takeover by Telefónica for £18 billion and delisted. In 2004, BT launched Consult 21, a consultation organisation that was to aid BT 21CN in the eventual conversion to digital telephony.

In 2004, BT was awarded the contract to deliver and manage N3, a secure and fast broadband network for the NHS National Programme for IT (NPfIT) program, on behalf of the English National Health Service (NHS). In 2005, BT made a number of acquisitions. In February 2005, BT acquired Infonet (now re-branded BT Infonet), a large telecoms company based in El Segundo, California, giving BT access to new geographies. It also acquired the Italian company Albacom. Then in April 2005, it bought Radianz from Reuters (now rebranded as BT Radianz), which expanded BT's coverage and provided BT with more buying power in certain countries.

In August 2006, BT acquired online electrical retailer Dabs.com for £30.6 million. The BT Home Hub manufactured by Inventel was also launched in June 2006. In October 2006, BT confirmed that it would be investing 75% of its total capital spending, put at £10 billion over five years, in its new Internet Protocol (IP) based 21st century network (21CN). Annual savings of £1 billion per annum were expected when the transition to the new network was to have been completed in 2010, with over 50% of its customers to have been transferred by 2008. That month the first customers on to 21CN was successfully tested at Adastral Park in Suffolk.

=== 2007 to 2012 ===
In January 2007, BT acquired Sheffield-based ISP, PlusNet plc, adding 200,000 customers. BT stated that PlusNet will continue to operate separately out of its Sheffield head-office. On 1 February 2007, BT announced agreed terms to acquire International Network Services Inc. (INS), an international provider of IT consultancy and software. In February 2007, Sir Michael Rake succeeded Sir Christopher Bland. In April that year, they acquired COMSAT International, followed in October by the acquisition of Lynx Technology.

BT acquired Wire One Communications in June 2008 and folded the company into "BT Conferencing", its existing conferencing unit, as a new video business unit In July 2008, BT acquired the online business directory firm Ufindus for £20 million in order to expand its position in the local information market in GB. On 28 July 2008, BT acquired Ribbit, of Mountain View, California, "Silicon Valley's First Phone Company". Ribbit provides Adobe Flash/Flex APIs, allowing web developers to incorporate telephony features into their software as a service (SaaS) applications.

In the early days of its fibre broadband rollout, BT said it would deliver fibre-to-the-premises (FTTP) to around 25% of the Country, with the rest catered for by the slower fibre-to-the-cabinet (FTTC), which uses copper wiring to deliver the final stretch of the connection. In 2014, with less than 0.7% of the company's fibre network being FTTP, BT dropped the 25% target, saying that it was "far less relevant today" because of improvements made to the headline speed of FTTC, which had doubled to 80 Mbit/s since its fibre broadband rollout was first announced. To supplement FTTC, BT offered an 'FTTP on Demand' product. In January 2015, BT stopped taking orders for the on-demand product.

On 1 April 2009, BT Engage IT was created from the merger of two previous BT acquisitions, Lynx Technology and Basilica. Apart from the name change not much else changed in operations for another 12 months. On 14 May 2009, BT said it was cutting up to 15,000 jobs in the coming year after it announced its results for the year to 31 March 2009. Then in July 2009, BT offered workers a long holiday for an up front sum of 25% of their annual wage or a one-off payment of £1000 if they agree to go part-time.

On 6 April 2011, BT launched the first online not-for-profit fundraising service for UK charities called BT MyDonate as part of its investment to the community. The service will pass on 100% of all donations made through the site to the charity, and unlike other services which take a proportion as commission and charge charities for using their services, BT will only pass on credit/debit card charges for each donation. The service allows people to register to give money to charity or collect fundraising donations. BT developed MyDonate with the support of Cancer Research UK, Changing Faces, KidsOut, NSPCC and Women's Aid.

=== 2013 to 2020 ===
BT logo used from 2003 to 2019

In March 2013, BT was allocated 4G spectrum in the UK following an auction and assignment by Ofcom, after paying £201.5m. On 1 August 2013, BT launched its first television channels, BT Sport, to compete with rival broadcaster Sky Sports. Plans for the channels' launch came about when it was announced in June 2012 that BT had been awarded a package of broadcast rights for the Premier League from the 2013–14 to 2015–16 season, broadcasting 38 matches from each season. In February 2013, BT acquired ESPN Inc.'s UK and Ireland TV channels, continuing its expansion into sports broadcasting. ESPN America and ESPN Classic were both closed, while ESPN continued to be operated by BT. On 9 November 2013, BT announced it had acquired exclusive rights to the Champions League and Europa League for £897m, from the 2015 season, with some free games remaining including both finals.

On 1 November 2014, BT created a new central business services organisation to provide customer services and improve operational efficiency. On 24 November 2014, shares in BT rose considerably on the announcement that the company was in talks to buy back O2, while at the same time confirmed it was also in talks to acquire EE. BT subsequently entered into exclusive talks to buy EE for £12.5 billion on 15 December 2014 and confirmed on 5 February 2015, subject to regulatory approval. The deal combined BT's 10 million retail customers and EE's 24.5 million direct mobile subscribers. Deutsche Telekom would own 12% of BT, while Orange S.A. would own 4%.

In March 2015, BT launched a 4G service as BT Mobile BT Group CEO Gavin Patterson announced that BT plans to migrate all of its customers onto the IP network by 2025, switching off the company's ISDN network. On 15 January 2016, BT received approval by the Competition and Markets Authority to acquire EE. The deal was officially completed on 29 January 2016 with Deutsche Telekom then owning 12% of BT, while Orange S.A. owned 4%.

On 1 February 2016, BT announced a new organisational structure to take effect from April 2016 after acquiring EE. The EE brand, network and high street stores became a second consumer division, operating alongside BT Consumer to serve customers with mobile services, broadband and TV and continued to deliver the Emergency Services Network contract awarded to EE in late 2015. There was to be a new BT Business and Public Sector division with around £5bn of revenues to serve small and large businesses as well as the public sector in the UK and Ireland. It was to comprise the existing BT Business division along with EE's business division and those parts of BT Global Services that are UK focused. There will also be another new division; BT Wholesale and Ventures that will comprise the existing BT Wholesale division along with EE's MVNO business as well as some specialist businesses such as Fleet, Payphones and Directories. Gerry McQuade, Chief Sales and Marketing Officer, Business at EE, was to be its CEO.

On 8 June 2017, BT appointed KPMG as its new auditor to replace PwC in the wake of a fraud scandal in Italy that triggered a major profit warning earlier that year. Also in of that year, KPMG fired six US employees over a scandal that calls into question efforts to ensure that public company accounts are being properly scrutinised. On 8 July 2017, The Daily Telegraph reported that BT "has called in consultants from McKinsey to conduct a review of its businesses in the hope of saving hundreds of millions of pounds per year. The work, dubbed 'Project Novator', is understood to include a potential merger of BT's struggling global services corporate networking and IT unit with its business and public sector division". On 28 July 2017, BT again announced organisational changes to "simplify its operating model, strengthen accountabilities and accelerate its transformation" to bring together its BT Consumer and EE divisions into a new unified BT Consumer division to operate across three brands – BT, EE and Plusnet. It was to take effect from 1 April 2018.

On 18 April 2018, BT announced further organisational changes after unification of BT Consumer and EE divisions, bringing together its BT Business and Public Sector and BT Wholesale and Ventures divisions into a new unified division known as BT Enterprise. It was to include BT's Ventures business which "acts as an incubator for potential new growth areas of the company" and to report as a single unit from 1 October 2018.

=== 2021 to present ===
In February 2021, BT and EE launched a fixed-line home broadband service that can also use the mobile network. With the introduction of the Hybrid Connect device, customers who lost connection through their Smart Hub 2 would automatically be connected to EE's mobile network, giving them an uninterrupted connection that BT described as "unbreakable". In June 2021, French telecommunications company Altice acquired a 12% stake in BT, increasing to 18% in December 2021 and 24.5% in May 2023. Patrick Drahi's purchase of 650 million shares cost about £960 million.

Altice's increasing stake in BT Group posed questions around the national security of the United Kingdom's infrastructure, and the UK government opened an investigation in May 2022 to look into possible security implications. In August 2022, the government completed its investigation and ruled that Drahi would not be required to cut his stake in BT, concluding that the investment did not pose any national security risks. In July 2023, BT announced the appointment of businesswoman Allison Kirkby as its first female chief executive, replacing Philip Jansen in February 2024. In June 2024, Carlos Slim acquired a 3.2% equity stake in the group. Two months later, Sunil Mittal's Bharti Enterprises paid around £3.2bn for Drahi's 24.5% stake.

In May 2025, BT announced plans to create BT International, a new standalone unit for serving its global customers. In November 2026, BT increased its network capacity, caching and network monitoring, in addition to limiting scheduled maintenance, in preparation for the release of Grand Theft Auto VI to prevent network congestion. Pre-loading of the game generated the second-highest traffic peak on its network, behind the 2025–26 UEFA Champions League semi-final between Arsenal and Atlético Madrid in May 2026. However, the pre-loading surpassed the football match on 18 November, ahead of the game's midnight release.

== Operations ==
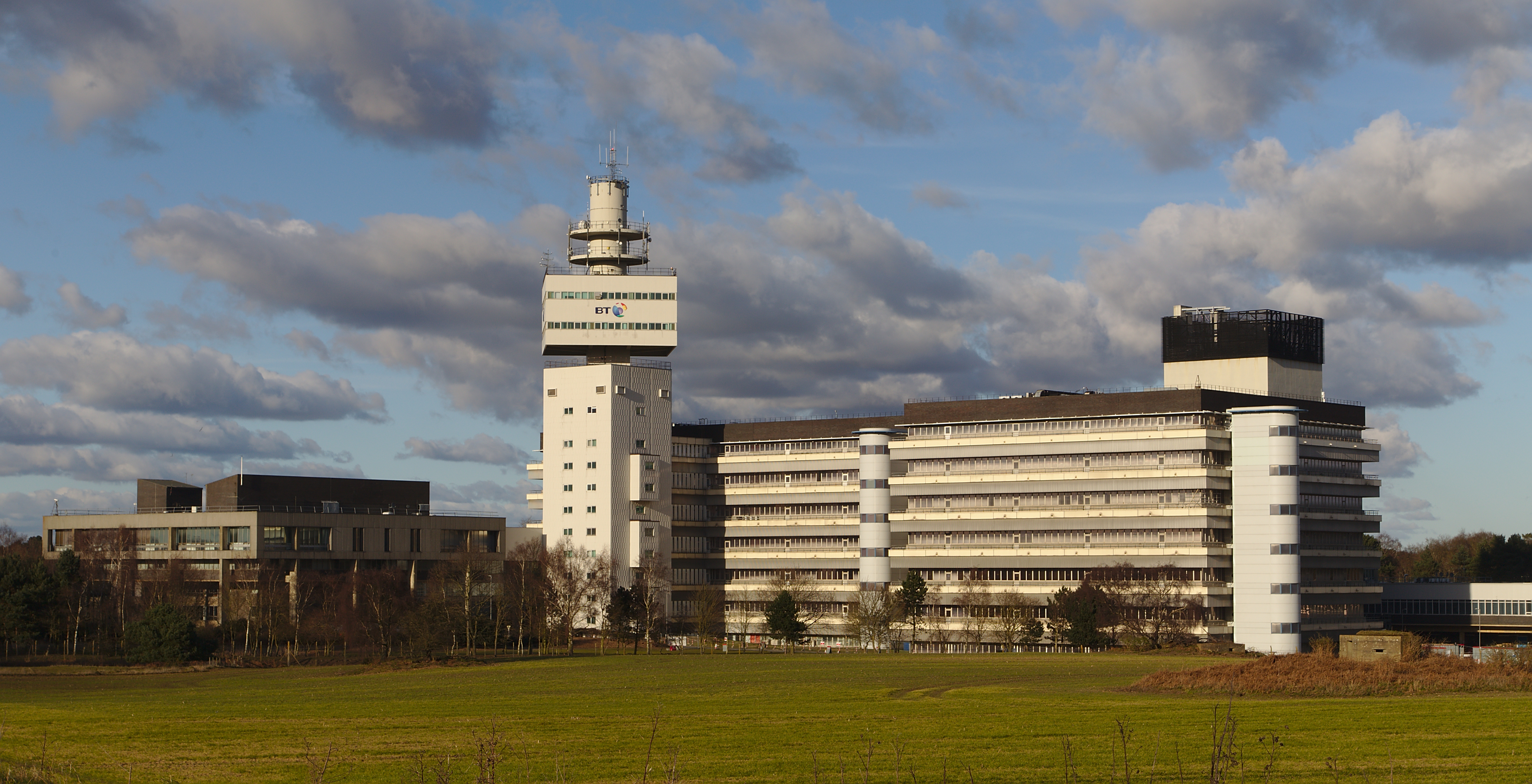
The Adastral Park campus at Martlesham Heath in Suffolk, the principal site of BT Research

BT Group is a holding company; the majority of its businesses and assets are held by its wholly owned subsidiary British Telecommunications plc. BT's businesses are operated under special government regulation by the British telecoms regulator Ofcom (formerly Oftel). BT has been found to have significant market power in some markets following market reviews by Ofcom. In these markets, BT is required to comply with additional obligations such as meeting reasonable requests to supply services and not to discriminate.

BT runs the telephone exchanges, trunk network and local loop connections for the vast majority of British fixed-line telephones. Apart from KCOM Group, which serves Kingston upon Hull, BT is the only UK telecoms operator to have a universal service obligation which means it must provide a fixed telephone line to any address in the UK, at a uniform price throughout the country. This requirement was introduced by the Electronic Communications (Universal Service) Order 2003, which also covers provision of directories, a directory enquiry service, and public call boxes. Legislation in 2018 added a minimum standard of fixed broadband service, subject to a cap on the cost of provision, which Ofcom implemented as a set of conditions applying to BT and KCOM in 2020. Reduced usage of public phone boxes led Ofcom to vary the conditions relating to them in 2022.

As well as continuing to provide service in those traditional areas in which BT has an obligation to provide services or is closely regulated, BT has expanded into more profitable products and services where there is less regulation. These are, principally, broadband internet service and bespoke solutions in telecommunications and information technology.

=== Branding ===
Simplified BT logo, used since 2019 for non-corporate purposes

In 2019, a simplified BT logo and brand was launched to replace the previous multi-coloured globe logo. In April 2022, BT announced its intentions to focus on the EE brand for consumer products.

== Corporate affairs ==
=== Buildings and facilities ===
As BT operates in around 180 countries, it owns and leases a range of buildings and facilities in the UK and around the world. In 2001, it sold some of its UK property portfolio for £2.38 billion to Telereal Trillium in a 30-year leaseback. The deal included 6,700 properties and contributed towards alleviating its debt at the time, with the main advantage being flexibility as it allows BT to vacate property over time, so as to adapt to changing operational requirements.

==== Headquarters ====
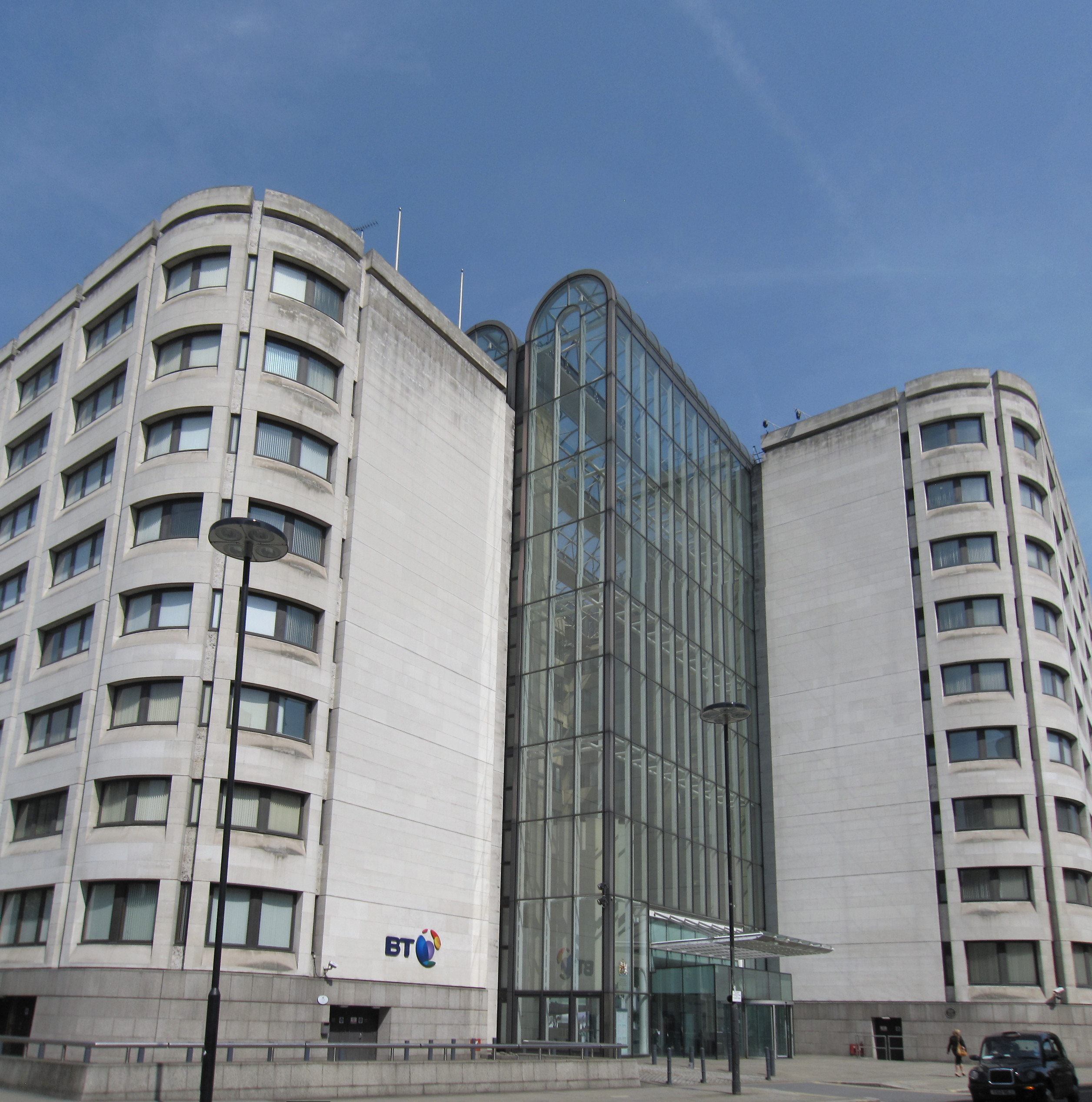
The BT Centre was completed in 1985.

Until December 2021, BT Group's world headquarters and registered office was the BT Centre, a 10-storey office building at 81 Newgate Street in the City of London, opposite St Paul's tube station. In November 2021, BT relocated to new headquarters at One Braham, a brand new 18-storey building completed earlier in 2021. In March 2024, BT Group opened a new multi-million-pound hub and Welsh headquarters in Cardiff for 1,000 BT Group employees.

==== Buildings and stations ====
Some of its UK buildings and stations are:

- Adastral Park – headquarters of BT Labs in Suffolk
- The Assembly – building in Bristol
- Baynard House – building in City of London
- BT Riverside Tower – headquarters of BT Northern Ireland in Belfast
- BT Tower – building in Swansea
- Goonhilly Satellite Earth Station – satellite earth station in Cornwall
- Guardian telephone exchange – telephone exchange in Manchester
- Madley Communications Centre – satellite earth station in Herefordshire
- National Network Management Centre – network operations centre in Shropshire
- Stadium House – building in Cardiff

==== Telecommunications towers ====
BT remains one of the largest owners of telecommunications towers in the UK and were a major node in its microwave network. Its BT Tower in London is notable for numerous reasons such as being the tallest building in the UK from its construction in the 1960s until the early 1980s, its revolving restaurant at the top known as 'Top of the Tower' in operation through the late 1960s and 1970s, and remains one of the UK's most important communications nerve centres, the heart of a vast broadcasting and communications network. It carries approximately 95% of the UK's TV content, including live broadcasts and 99% of all live football games as well as pioneering the first international HD, 3D and 4K television transmissions. It serves media production and distribution customers around the world and as part of the Things Connected Network launched in London, it became the highest building in the world to host an Internet of things (IoT) base station in September 2016. Some of its towers are:

- BT Tower in London
- BT Tower in Birmingham
- Charwelton BT Tower in Northamptonshire
- Heaton Park BT Tower in Manchester
- Morborne Hill BT Tower in Cambridgeshire
- Purdown BT Tower in Bristol
- Pye Green BT Tower in Staffordshire
- Stokenchurch BT Tower in Buckinghamshire
- Sutton Common BT Tower in Cheshire
- Tinshill BT Tower in West Yorkshire
- Tolsford Hill BT Tower in Kent
- Turners Hill BT Tower in West Midlands
- Wotton-under-Edge BT Tower in Gloucestershire
- Zouches Farm in Bedfordshire

==== Other ====
Some of its other UK facilities are:

- Red telephone box – original telephone boxes
- KX telephone boxes – successor to the red telephone boxes
- LinkUK – modern kiosks replacing existing telephone boxes with a range of free services
- TAT-14 – 14th consortium transatlantic telecommunications cable system

=== Divisions ===
BT Group is organised into the following divisions:

==== Customer facing ====
- BT Consumer – provides retail telecoms services to consumers in the UK including:
  - BT Broadband
  - BT Mobile
  - EE Broadband
  - EE Mobile
  - EE TV
  - EE WiFi
  - Plusnet – internet service provider, provides fixed communications services to consumers in the UK
  - TNT Sports (joint venture, operated by Warner Bros. Discovery)
- BT Business – products and services to organisations in the small-to-medium-sized business, corporate and public sectors in the UK and globally, and wholesale services. Formed from the merger of BT Enterprise and BT Global Services.
- Openreach – fenced-off wholesale division, established in 2005 following a review by Ofcom and commenced operations in 2006, employing 25,000 engineers previously employed by BT. Its purpose is to ensure that other communications providers have the same operational conditions as BT, and is responsible for the provision and repair in the "last mile" of copper wire.

==== Internal services ====
- Networks – Responsible for designing, building and running the networks and technology platforms.
  - BT Research
- Digital – Responsible for leading BT's digital transformation.
- BT's procurement arm, "BT Sourced", was established in February 2021 and is based in Dublin.

=== Key people ===
As of May 2026, BT's board of directors is led by Adam Crozier (CEO), Allison Kirkby (chief executive), and Simon Lowth (CFO). Non-executive directors include Alex Chisholm, Sunil Bharti Mittal, Gopal Vittal and Sara Weller.

=== Pension fund ===
BT has the second largest defined benefit pension plan of any UK public company. The trustees valued the scheme at £36.7 billion at the end of 2010; an actuarial valuation valued the deficit of the scheme at £9.043 billion as of 31 December 2008. Following a change in the regulations governing inflation index linking, the deficit was estimated at £5.2 billion in November 2010.

The BT Pension Scheme manages the defined benefit pension scheme. The scheme closed to new members in 2001 and closed to future accrual for almost all members in 2018. As at 30 June 2025, the scheme had £35.7bn of assets under management, of which 49% was in government and corporate bonds. The scheme had 212,468 pensioner members receiving a pension, 46,108 deferred members no longer accruing extra benefits and 12 active members remaining accruing extra benefits.

=== Sponsorships ===
BT sponsored Scotland's domestic rugby union championship and cup competitions between 1999 and 2006. On 31 July 2012, it was announced that BT agreed a three-year sponsorship deal with Ulster Rugby and sees BT become the Official Communications Partner. BT's logo will appear on the Ulster Rugby shirt sleeve for all friendlies, Heineken Cup and RaboDirect Pro12 matches as well as a significant brand presence at their home ground; Ravenhill Stadium. On 29 July 2013, it was announced that BT had partnered up with Scottish Rugby Union in a four-year sponsorship deal with its two professional clubs; Edinburgh Rugby and Glasgow Warriors that will commence from August 2013. The deal involves BT Sport becoming the new shirt sponsor for both clubs as well as being promoted with BT Group at their respective home grounds; Scotstoun Stadium and Murrayfield Stadium.

On 13 May 2014, BT joined Sky, TalkTalk and Virgin Media as founding partners of Internet Matters, a not-for-profit organisation that provides online safety advice for parents and their children. On 28 May 2014, it was announced that BT agreed a £20 million four-year sponsorship deal with Scottish Rugby Union which includes BT securing the naming rights for Murrayfield Stadium which becomes BT Murrayfield Stadium, become sponsor of the Scotland sevens team, become principal and exclusive sponsor of Scotland's domestic league and cup competitions from next season, taking over the role from The Royal Bank of Scotland and become sponsor of Scottish Rugby's four new academies that aims to drive forward standards for young players who have aspirations to play professionally.

On 14 April 2015, it was announced that as part of BT's current £20 million four-year sponsorship deal with Scottish Rugby Union that was announced in May 2014, BT has completed its sponsorship portfolio following an additional investment of £3.6 million for the 3 years remaining of its sponsorship deal, to become the new shirt sponsor for the Scotland national teams. On 27 January 2016, it was announced that BT, alongside YouTube will be the new joint headline sponsors in a three-year deal with Edinburgh International Television Festival. The two companies will "share prominence across all branding of the 41st TV Festival, including the MacTaggart Lecture and will work closely with the festival organisers in their bid to reflect new trends in a rapidly transforming industry, from new ways of distributing content to technical innovations such as virtual reality".

BT is the founding and principal partner of the Wayne Rooney Foundation, which was established to improve the lives of children and young people. The Foundation will run events "to raise vital funds to support the work of key organisations dedicated to supporting disadvantaged and vulnerable children and young people". These organisations are four chosen charities which are, Manchester United Foundation, NSPCC, Claire House Children's Hospice and Alder Hey Children's Hospital. The first of these events was Wayne's testimonial match in August 2016 between Manchester United and Everton which raised £1.2 million. The match was screened live through BT Sport with BT MyDonate being the official fundraising platform for the testimonial, with both online and text options for donations promoted during the match.

On 26 May 2017, it was announced that BT will sponsor the 2017 British Urban Film Festival (BUFF) and sees BT host every event of the film festival, including the Awards at the BT Tower. BT will also broadcast the awards ceremony on its website and will have the opportunity to screen films acquired from the festival on its BT TV store platform. On 6 September 2017, it was announced that BT had extended its current £20 million four-year sponsorship deal with Scottish Rugby Union that was announced in May 2014, for a further three years beginning from June 2018. The new deal sees BT retain the naming rights to BT Murrayfield Stadium, alongside its role as principal partner of the Scotland national team and Scotland 7s. BT's logo will continue to be displayed on the front of Scotland rugby shirts, in the Six Nations Championship, as well as the summer and autumn test matches. BT will also continue to be promoted at Edinburgh Rugby and Scotstoun Stadium.

On 4 June 2019, it was announced that BT had agreed to a five-year sponsorship deal with The Football Association (the FA) as its lead partner, reportedly worth £50–60 million. The agreement covered all 28 England teams and placed BT's logo on men's and women's senior, youth, futsal and disability training kits. It also extended EE's sponsorship as the lead partner of Wembley Stadium following a £25 million six-year deal agreed with the FA in February 2014, prior to BT's acquisition. Aimed at making Wembley "the most connected stadium in the world", the 2014 sponsorship made EE a supplier to the men's senior team and the FA Cup, and introduced mobile ticketing, contactless payments, enhanced mobile network coverage and Wi-Fi, a dedicated app featuring event feeds as well as stadium and travel information, and a new composite logo branding the partnership as "Wembley Stadium connected by EE". Through the partnership, EE rolled out 4G network upgrades to boost speeds and capacity, hosted the first live 5G broadcast of the EE Wembley Cup, and prepared the stadium for 5G connectivity. Both deals provided BT and EE customers with access to tickets, events and promotional initiatives.

On 15 July 2025, BT was announced as the official technology supplier for the Emirates Great Britain SailGP, which is being organized at Portsmouth, Great Britain. On 7 May 2026, BT was appointed as the official telecommunications partner of UEFA Euro 2028, which is scheduled to take place across the UK and Ireland in summer 2028.

=== Historical financial performance ===
BT's financial results have been as follows:

==== 2009–present ====
Year ending 31 March	2009	2010	2011	2012	2013	2014	2015	2016	2017	2018	2019	2020	2021	2022	2023	2024	2025	2026
Turnover (£m)	21,390	20,911	20,076	19,307	18,017	18,287	17,851	18,909	24,082	23,746	23,428	22,905	21,370	20,845	20,669	20,835	20,370	19,646
Profit/(loss) before tax (£m)	(134)	1,007	1,717	2,421	2,501	2,827	3,172	3,473	2,354	2,616	2,666	2,353	1,804	1,963	2,290	2,294	2,315	2,303
Net profit/(loss) (£m)	(81)	1,029	1,504	2,003	2,091	2,018	2,135	2,588	1,908	2,032	2,159	1,734	1,472	1,274	1,905	855	1,054	1,077
Basic eps (p)	3.2	13.3	19.4	23.7	26.7	25.7	26.5	33.2	19.2	20.5	21.8	17.5	14.8	12.9	19.4	8.7	10.8	11.0

==== 1992–2008 ====
Year ending 31 March	1992	1993	1994	1995	1996	1997	1998	1999	2000	2001	2002	2003	2004	2005	2006	2007	2008
Turnover (£m)	13,337	13,242	13,675	13,893	14,446	14,935	15,640	16,953	18,715	17,141	18,447	18,727	18,519	18,429	19,514	20,223	20,704
Profit/(loss) before tax (£m)	3,073	1,972	2,756	2,662	3,019	3,203	3,214	4,295	2,942	(1,031)	1,461	3,157	1,945	2,693	2,633	2,484	1,976
Net profit/(loss) (£m)	2,044	1,220	1,767	1,731	1,986	2,077	1,702	2,983	2,055	(1,875)	1,008	2,702	1,414	1,539	1,644	2,852	1,738
Basic eps (p)	33.2	19.8	28.5	27.8	31.6	32.8	26.6	46.3	31.7	(25.8)	12.1	31.4	16.4	18.1	19.5	34.4	21.5

=== Re-registration ===
In June 2026, British Telecommunications plc re-registered with Companies House as a private limited company known as British Telecommunications Limited.

== Controversies ==
=== World Wide Web hyperlink patent ===
In 2001, BT discovered it owned a patent (U.S. patent 4,873,662) which it believed gave it patent rights on the use of hyperlink technology on the World Wide Web. The corresponding UK patent had already expired, but the US patent was valid until 2006. On 11 February 2002, BT began a court case relating to its claims in a US federal court against the internet service provider Prodigy Communications Corporation. In the case British Telecommunications plc v. Prodigy, the United States District Court for the Southern District of New York ruled on 22 August 2002 that the BT patent was not applicable to web technology and granted Prodigy's request for summary judgment of non-infringement.

=== Behavioural targeting ===
In early 2008, it was announced that BT had entered into a contract (along with Virgin Media and TalkTalk) with the spyware company Phorm (responsible under their 121Media guise for the Apropos rootkit) to intercept and analyse their users' click-stream data and sell the anonymised aggregate information as part of Phorm's OIX advertising service. The practice, known as "behavioural targeting" and condemned by critics as "data pimping", came under intense fire from various internet communities and other interested-parties who believe that the interception of data without the consent of users and web site owners is illegal under UK law (RIPA). At a more fundamental level, many have argued that the ISPs and Phorm have no right to sell a commodity (a user's data, and the copyrighted content of web sites) to which they have no claim of ownership. In response to questions about Phorm and the interception of data by the Webwise system Sir Tim Berners-Lee, the creator of the World Wide Web, indicated his disapproval of the concept and is quoted as saying of his data and web history:

It's mine – you can't have it. If you want to use it for something, then you have to negotiate with me. I have to agree, I have to understand what I'm getting in return. I myself feel that it is very important that my ISP supplies internet to my house like the water company supplies water to my house. It supplies connectivity with no strings attached. My ISP doesn't control which websites I go to, it doesn't monitor which websites I go to.

— Sir Tim Berners-Lee, 2008

=== Huawei infrastructure access ===
Beginning in 2010, the UK intelligence community investigated Huawei, the Chinese supplier of BT's new fibre infrastructure with increasing urgency after the United States, Canada and Australia prevented the company from operating in their countries. Although BT had notified the UK government in 2003 of Huawei's interest in their £10bn network upgrade contract, they did not raise the security implications as BT failed to explain that the Chinese company would have unfettered access to critical infrastructure. On 16 December 2012, the then prime minister David Cameron was supplied with an in-depth report indicating that the intelligence services had very grave doubts regarding Huawei, and that UK governmental, military, and civilian privacy may have been under serious threat.

On 7 June 2013, British lawmakers concluded that BT should not have allowed Huawei access to the UK's communications network without ministerial oversight, saying they were 'deeply shocked' that BT did not inform government that they were allowing Huawei and ZTE, both with ties to the Chinese military, unfettered access to critical national systems. Furthermore, ministers discovered that the agency with the responsibility to ensure Chinese equipment and code was threat-free was entirely staffed by Huawei employees. Subsequently, parliamentarians confirmed that in case of an attack on the UK there was nothing that could be done to stop Chinese infiltration.

By 2016, Huawei had put measures in place to ensure the integrity of UK national security. Specifically their UK work is now overseen by a board that includes directors from GCHQ, the Cabinet Office and the Home Office. ZTE, another Chinese company that supplies extensive network equipment and subscriber hardware used with BT 'Infinity', was also under scrutiny by parliament's intelligence and security committee after the US, Canada, Australia and the European Union declared the company a security risk. In 2020, following a government ruling, BT began removing Huawei equipment from its broadband and mobile networks in order to comply with new restrictions on the usage of Huawei equipment. The process was finally completed by March 2024.

=== Alleged complicity with drone strikes in Yemen and Somalia ===
In September 2012, BT entered into a $23 million deal with the US military to provide a key communications cable connecting RAF Croughton, a US military base on UK soil, with Camp Lemonnier, a large US base in Djibouti. Camp Lemonnier is used as a base for American drone attacks in Yemen and Somalia, and has been described by The Economist as "the most important base for drone operations outside the war zone of Afghanistan." Human rights groups including Reprieve and Amnesty International have criticised the use of armed drones outside declared war zones. Evidence produced by The Bureau of Investigative Journalism and Stanford University's International Human Rights & Conflict Resolution Clinic suggest that drone strikes have caused substantial civilian casualties, and may be illegal under international law.

In 2013, BT was the subject of a complaint by Reprieve to the Department of Business, Innovation and Skills under the OECD Guidelines for Multinational Enterprises, following their refusal to explain whether or not their infrastructure was used to facilitate drone strikes. The subsequent refusal of this complaint was appealed in May 2014, on the basis that the UK National Contact Point's decision did not follow the OECD Guidelines. The issue of bias was also raised, due to the appointment of Lord Ian Livingston as government minister for the department which was processing the complaint: Livingston had occupied a senior position at BT when the cable between RAF Croughton and Camp Lemonnier was originally built.

=== Overcharging ===
In February 2017, a review of the telecoms market by Ofcom found that BT's landline only contracts provided poor value to customers. Ofcom ordered BT to reduce their prices but stopped short of demanding that customers were compensated. In January 2021, Law firm Mishcon de Reya filed a claim with the Competition Appeal Tribunal against BT worth £600 million, accusing them of historic overcharging on landlines. The class action lawsuit claims BT have increased their prices for line-only services every year since 2009, whilst the wholesale cost for delivering these services has reduced. The claimants suggest that customers could be entitled to compensation of up to £500 each.

=== Bidding rules violation ===
In 2020, BT was fined £6.3m by the telecoms regulator Ofcom for violating the law on a large public sector deal in Northern Ireland. Under Ofcom's regulations, the BT network shall handle all wholesale customers similarly. In its report, Ofcom found that BT's network violated the rules by failing to supply Eir with the same details on its on-demand fibre-to-the-premises offering as its own rival team.

=== OFCOM fines for non-functioning 999 calls ===
On 25 June 2023, a "catastrophic failure" in BT's network resulted in nearly 14,000 attempted 999 emergency calls not being connected. Ofcom fined BT £17.5 million, citing the telecom giant's lack of preparedness and poorly documented backup procedures.

== Historical documents ==
Records of the Post Office Corporation (Telecommunications division) 1969–1981 and its predecessors (including Post Office Telegraph and Telephone Service 1864–1969 and some private telegraph and telephone companies) are Public Records, and are held by BT Archives.

== See also ==
- List of telecommunications companies
- UK telephone area codes (STD codes)
