= KidsOut =

British charity organization

- Founded: 1999
- Type: Charitable organization
- Registration no.: 1075789 (England and Wales) SC039477 (Scotland)
- Purpose: Children
- Location: Leighton Buzzard, England, UK
- Region served: United Kingdom
- Website: www.kidsout.org.uk

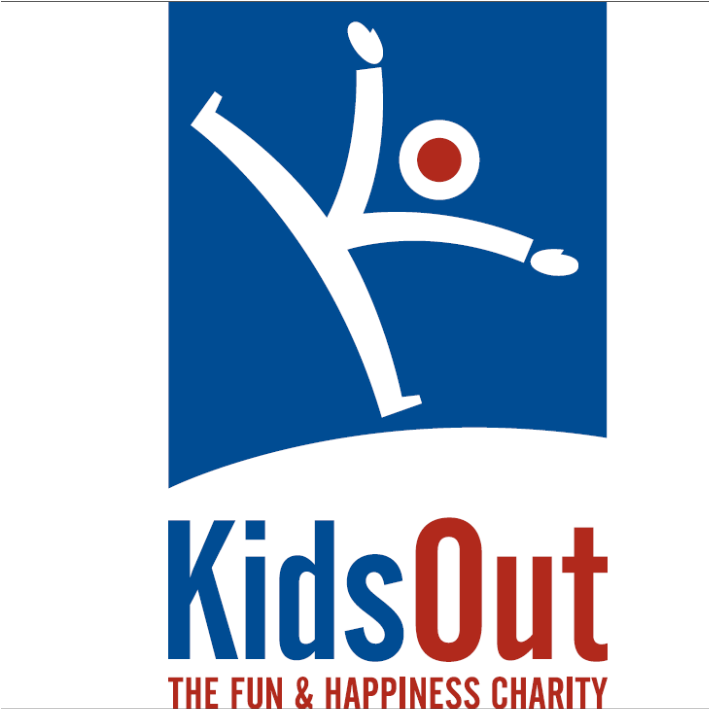
The KidsOut logo

Kids Out UK is a UK-based charity located in Leighton Buzzard, offering a variety of services aimed at supporting children who along with their mothers have fled domestic abuse and live in women's refuges. It also supports thousands of other underprivileged children. Reports show they provide fun and wellbeing experiences to approximately 80,000 children annually. This includes over 28,000 who live in a women's refuge. Other children receiving help include those with life-limiting disabilities, children who are carers for parents and or siblings, those from homes who are facing extreme financial hardship, or children facing social and rural isolation.

Families fleeing abuse usually turn up in refuge with no possessions. The charity provides a box of brand-new toys for children on arrival in refuge and again at Christmas so the children have something to open. It also take these and other disadvantaged children on fun days out during the year. These include trips to the seaside, theme parks, zoos, and the cinema. To date, KidsOut has taken nearly 1.1 million children on fun days out.

The charity is working to expand its services by developing arts, music, mental wellbeing, and sports programmes.

== History ==
KidsOut was established following an initiative by Lady Grantchester, a member of the Moore family, owners of Littlewoods, and a resident in Kingston. In 1990, she suggested to the Kingston Rotary Club that they organise a day out for disadvantaged children. Working with Peter Jarvis, and fellow Rotarians Graham Child and John Saxton, the concept of KidsOut was developed. The first event, organised in partnership with the Kingston Littlewoods store, involved an outing for 200 children to Thorpe Park. The success of this event prompted Lady Grantchester to offer a one-off grant to any Rotary Club willing to participate in similar outings on the second Wednesday of June.

This initiative quickly gained traction, with 800 Rotary Clubs across the UK joining the effort. The National Rotary KidsOut Day was subsequently established, becoming the largest organised outing for disadvantaged children in the UK.

The charity was incorporated in 1998, with amendments made in 1999, 2008, and 2023.

== Services ==
KidsOut provides a range of programmes aimed at supporting disadvantaged and vulnerable children in the UK. The charity seeks to create positive experiences and memories for children who might otherwise not have access to such opportunities. Annually, KidsOut up to 80,000 children through its services, including day trips, new toys, sensory rooms, wellbeing, and educational resources.

=== Toy Boxes ===
In collaboration with Women’s Aid, KidsOut supports over 28,000 children annually who along with their mothers have fled domestic abuse and find safety in a women's refuge. Most of these children arrive at refuges with no possessions. To assist with their transition into a new home, KidsOut provides age-appropriate Toy Boxes containing ten brand-new toys and books. In 2025, the charity distributed a box of ten brand new toys to every child living in a Women’s Aid supported refuge both on arrival in refuge and at Christmas.

=== Fun Days ===
The 'Fun Days' initiative was launched in 2012. It provides outings for disadvantaged and vulnerable children across the UK. Activities include visits to theatres, theme parks, and the seaside, providing opportunities for children to create positive and happy memories. The program has so far reached over one million children, including children facing extreme economic hardship, children living in women's refuges, those living with disabilities or experiencing life-limiting conditions, and children who are carers for their parent and or siblings.

=== The Giving Tree Shop ===
The charity's 'Giving Tree - Fun & Happiness Shop' was established in 2008. It gives individuals, companies, and organisations the opportunity to buy a toy or fun experience for a vulnerable child. During Christmastime, the charity provides a box of toys or age-appropriate gifts for children and young people living in Women's Aid supported refuges. Each Christmas the charity encourages people to swap their office Secret Santa event and instead buy a toy for a vulnerable child instead.

=== Multi-sensory rooms and units for children with complex needs ===
KidsOut provides multi-sensory units for organisations and schools looking after children with complex needs. This type of learning has been proven to increase speech and language development, communication skills, memory and comprehension, and can have a positive impact on children’s behaviour and development.

=== Food vouchers ===
The charity provides food vouchers to families in refuge. With any finances often prioritised for replacing essential belongings they were forced to leave behind, these vouchers provide a lifeline during school holidays when free school meals are not available.

=== Word Stories - free access to digital books from around the world ===
In 2017, KidsOut established World Stories, a free-to-access, growing collection of 175 traditional and original stories from around the world representing the 32 most commonly spoken languages by children in the UK. World Stories is an online resource that helps children improve their literacy and keep up in the classroom. The resource not only helps the one in seven UK children who speaks a language other than English as their first language, but also supports children with SEN requirements

== Governance ==
The charity is governed by a board of trustees and is also supported by 18 ambassadors and patrons including, John Parrott and Leigh Bromby
