= Red telephone box =

Kiosk for a public telephone

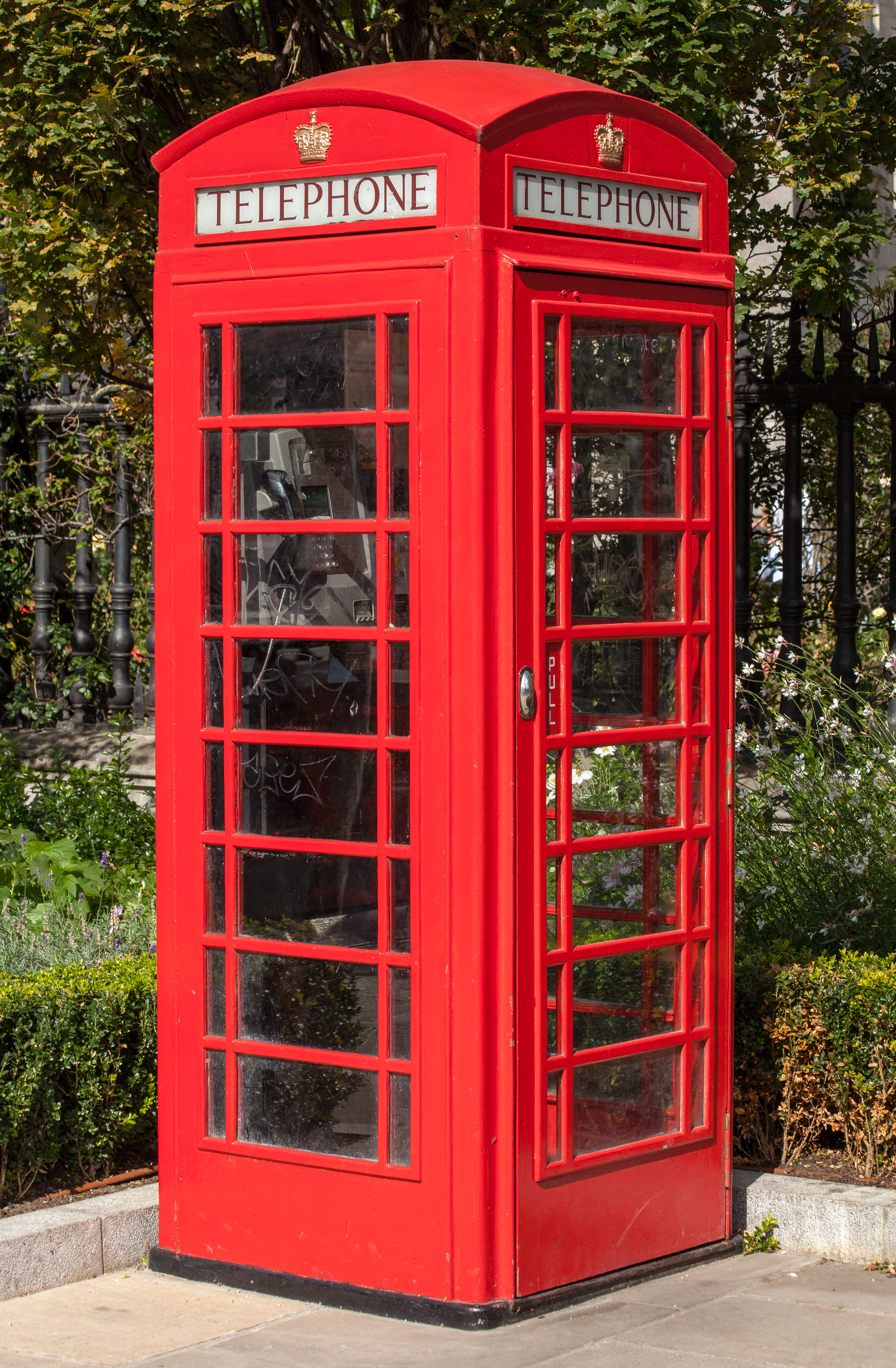
An example of a K6, the most common red telephone box model, photographed in London in 2012.

The red telephone box is a telephone kiosk for a public telephone designed by Sir Giles Gilbert Scott, the architect responsible for famous sites like Liverpool Cathedral and Battersea Power Station.

The telephone box is a familiar sight on the streets of the United Kingdom, its associated Crown Dependencies, the British Overseas Territories and Malta. Despite a reduction in their numbers in recent years, the traditional British red telephone kiosk can still be seen in many places throughout the UK, and in overseas territories, the Commonwealth and elsewhere around the world. The colour red was chosen to make them easy to spot.

From 1926 onwards, the fascias of the kiosks were emblazoned with a prominent crown, representing the British Government. The red phone box is often seen as a British cultural icon throughout the world. In 2006, the K2 telephone box was voted one of Britain's top 10 design icons, which included the Mini, Supermarine Spitfire, London tube map, World Wide Web, Concorde and the AEC Routemaster bus. In 2009, the K2 was selected by the Royal Mail for their "British Design Classics" commemorative postage stamp issue.

Many of the phone box designs are protected by trade mark registrations and copyright, held by British Telecommunications plc. In 2019, the prototype K2, located at Burlington House in London since 1924, was listed to Grade II* in "recognition of its iconic design status".

== Design history ==
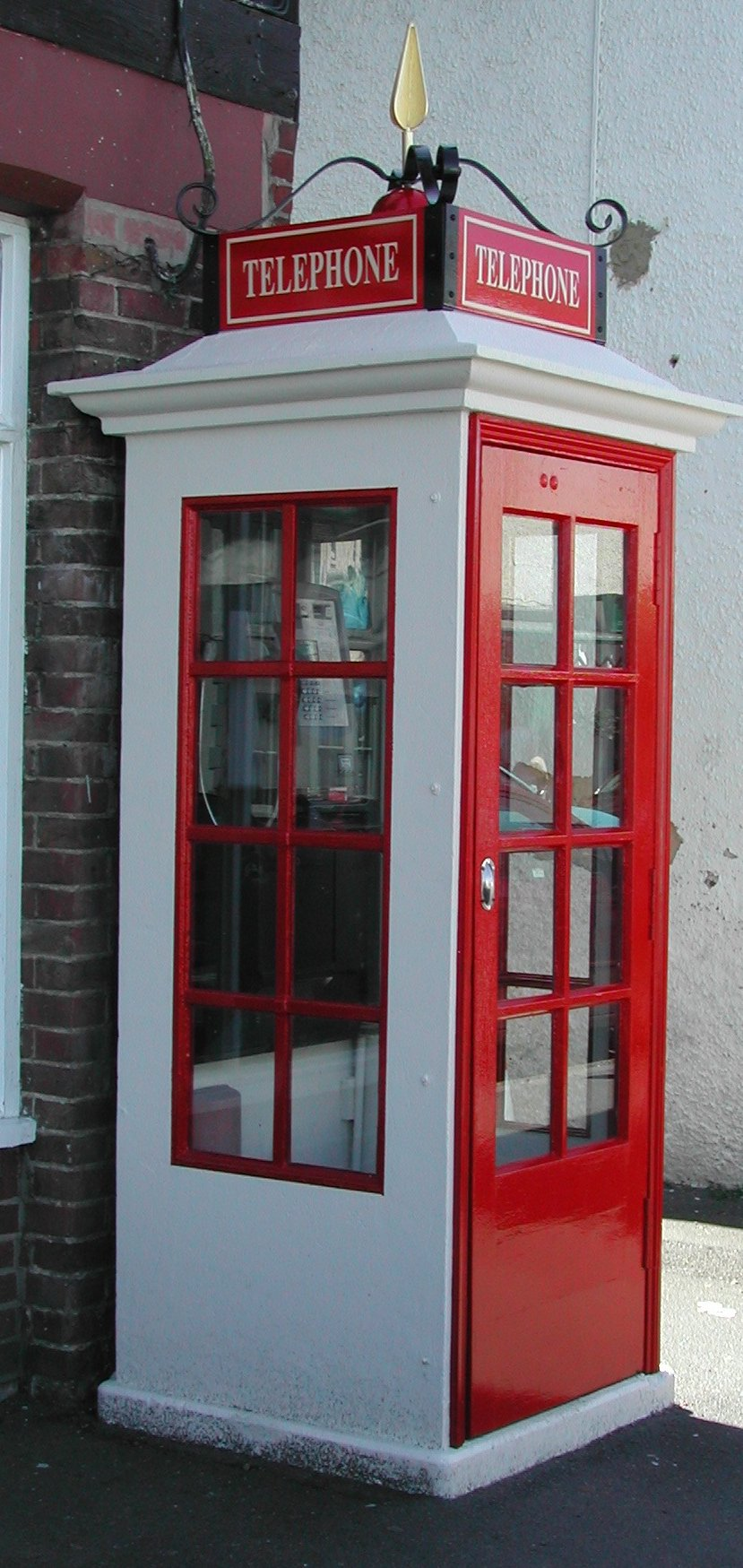
K1 Telephone Kiosk at Bembridge

=== K1 ===
The first standard public telephone kiosk introduced by the United Kingdom Post Office was produced in concrete in 1921 and was designated K1 (Kiosk No.1). The Post Office had taken over almost all of the country's telephone network in 1912. Some local authorities refused to give permission for the K1; Eastbourne Corporation insisted that the kiosks could only be installed if they had thatched roofs. The design of the K1 was not of the same family as the familiar red telephone boxes. As of 2021, there remain fourteen K1 boxes in the UK, including seven that are in museums and museum collections. A further two remain in the Republic of Ireland. Seven of the UK's fourteen have been listed at Grade II by Historic England, some of them still located on British streets, including one situated in Trinity Market in Kingston-upon-Hull, and another in Bembridge High Street, Isle of Wight.

=== K2 ===
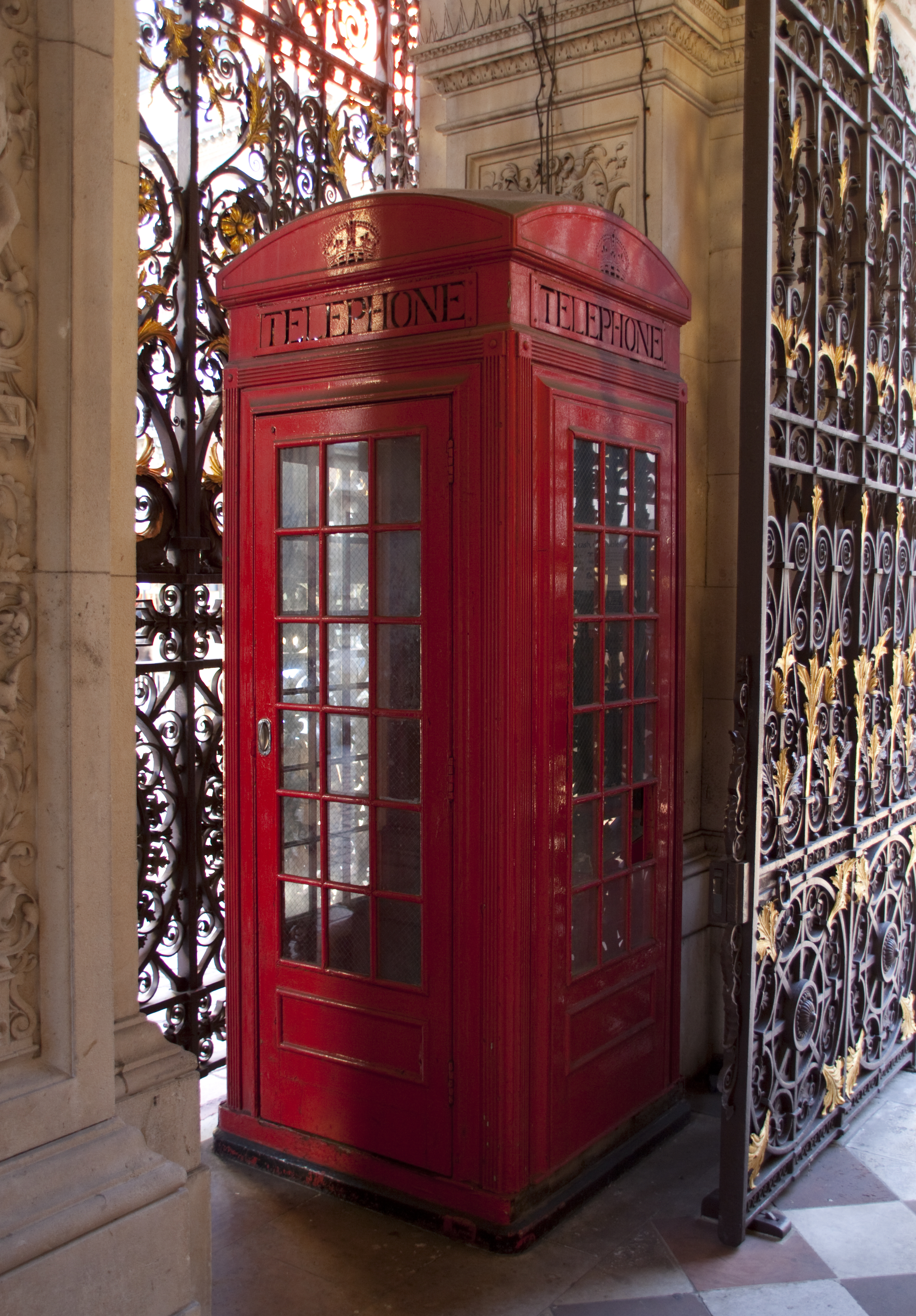
Prototype K2 at Burlington House (home of the Royal Academy of Arts) in London

The red telephone box was the result of a competition in 1924 to design a kiosk that would be acceptable to the London Metropolitan Boroughs which had hitherto resisted the Post Office's effort to erect K1 kiosks on their streets.

The Royal Fine Art Commission was instrumental in the choice of the British standard kiosk. Because of widespread dissatisfaction with the GPO's design, the Metropolitan Boroughs Joint Standing Committee organised a competition for a superior one in 1923, but the results were disappointing. The Birmingham Civic Society then produced a design of its own—in reinforced concrete—but it was informed by the Director of Telephones that the design produced by the Office of the Engineer-in-Chief was preferred; as the Architects' Journal commented, "no one with any knowledge of design could feel anything but indignation with the pattern that seems to satisfy the official mind". The Birmingham Civic Society did not give up and, with additional pressure from the Royal Institute of British Architects, the Town Planning Institute and the Royal Academy, the Postmaster General was forced to think again; and the result was that the RFAC organised a limited competition.

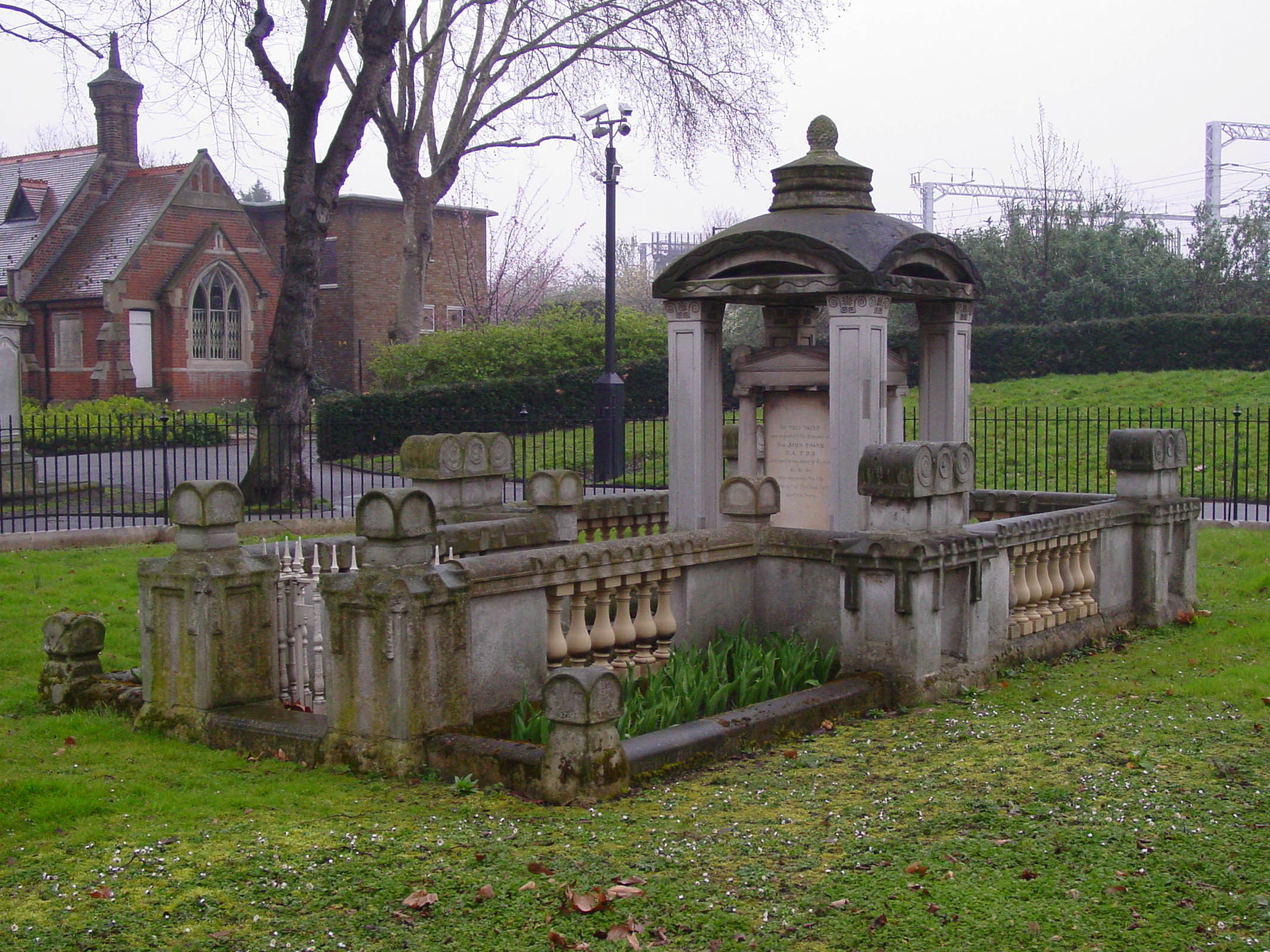
The dome of Sir John Soane's family mausoleum in St Pancras Old Churchyard, London, may have been an inspiration for the K2's design.

The organisers invited entries from three respected architects and, along with the designs from the Post Office and from The Birmingham Civic Society, the Fine Arts Commission judged the competition and selected the design submitted by Sir Giles Gilbert Scott. The invitation had come at the time when Scott had been made a trustee of Sir John Soane's Museum: his design for the competition was in the classical style, but topped with a dome reminiscent of those designed by Soane for his own family mausoleum in St Pancras Old Churchyard, and for the mausoleum for Sir Francis Bourgeois at Dulwich Picture Gallery, both in London. However, Gavin Stamp thinks it "unlikely" that Scott was directly inspired by either of these precedents, arguing instead that "a dome above segmental curves is, in fact, a logical solution to the geometrical problem of designing a sculptural termination to a square pillar when a flat top is not suitable".

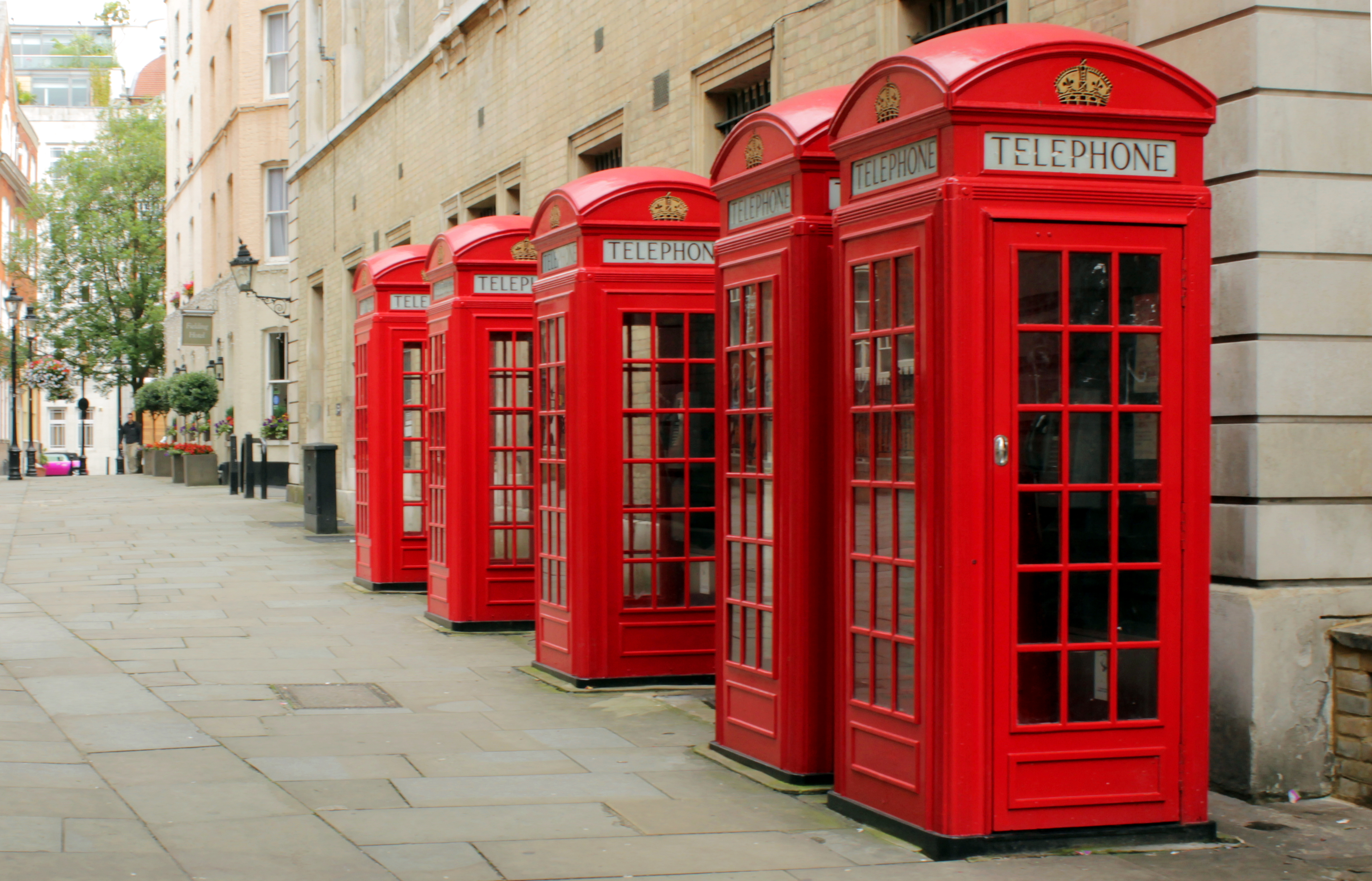
Cast iron K2 kiosks on Broad Court, Covent Garden, London

The original wooden prototypes of the entries were later put into public service at under-cover sites around London. That of Scott's design is the only one known to survive and is still where it was originally placed, in the left entrance arch to the Royal Academy at Burlington House. In 2019, it was listed to Grade II* in "recognition of its iconic design status".

The Post Office chose to make Scott's winning design in cast iron (Scott had suggested mild steel) and to paint it red (Scott had suggested silver, with a "greeny-blue" interior) and, with other minor changes of detail, it was brought into service as the Kiosk No.2 or K2. From 1926 K2 was deployed in and around London and the K1 continued to be erected elsewhere.

=== K3 ===
The K3, introduced in 1929, again by Giles Gilbert Scott, was similar to the K2 but was constructed from reinforced concrete and intended for nationwide use. Cheaper than the K2, it was still significantly more costly than the K1 and so that remained the choice for low-revenue sites. The standard colour scheme for both the K1 and the K3 was a light stone colour, with red glazing bars. A rare surviving K3 kiosk can be seen beside the Penguin Beach exhibit at ZSL London Zoo, where it has been protected from the weather by the projecting eaves and restored to its original colour scheme. There is another in use at Rhynd in Perthshire.

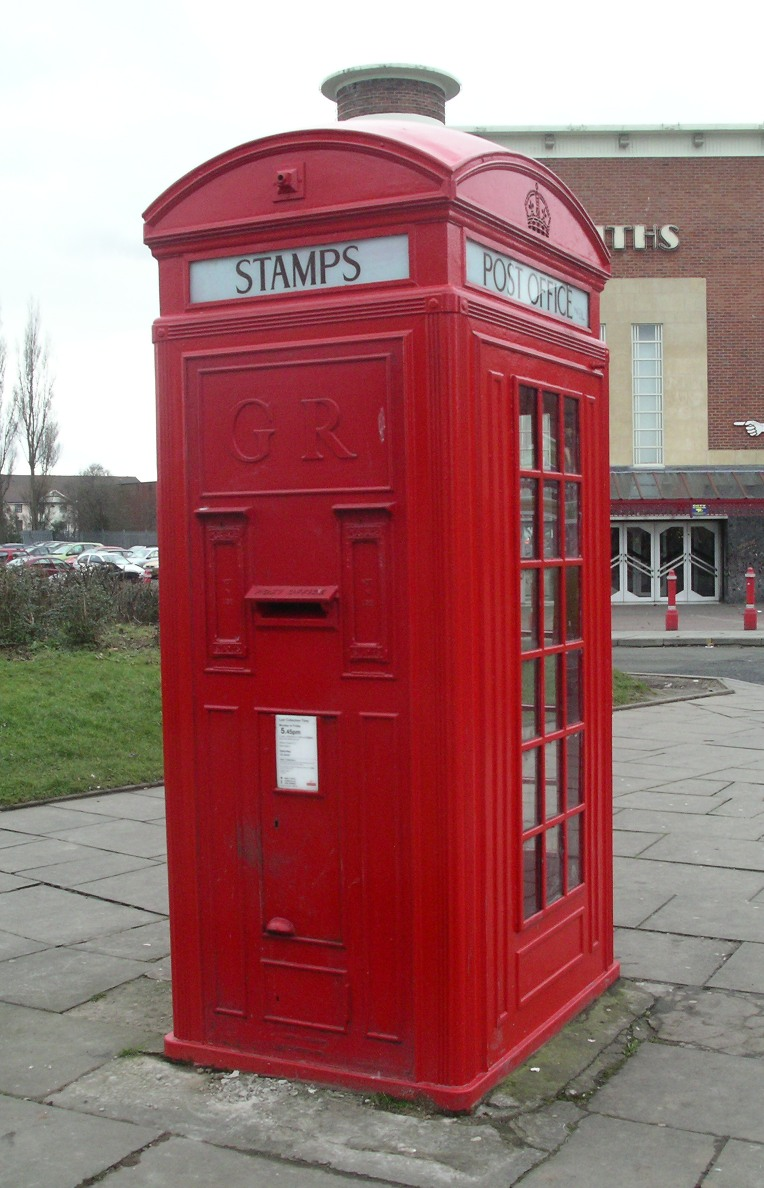
K4 Post Office in Warrington – the vertical panels either side of the letter-slot originally housed stamp vending machines

=== K4 ===
The K4 (designed by the Post Office Engineering Department in 1927) incorporated a post box and machines for buying postage stamps on the exterior. Only a single batch of 50 K4 kiosks were built. Some contemporary reports said the noise of the stamp-machines in operation disturbed phone-users, and the rolls of stamps in the machines became damp and stuck together in wet weather. This has been widely repeated (including by Stamp) but Johannessen chose not to, having found no evidence to support the story. Ten survive with four in public use at Frodsham, Warrington, Whitley Bay and near Tunstall, East Riding of Yorkshire. A fine example of a K4 may also be found outside the station building at Bewdley on the Severn Valley Railway. There is a fully restored K4 (including correct telephone and coin operations) at the Bury Transport Museum, Greater Manchester.

=== K5 ===
The K5 was a metal-faced plywood construction introduced in 1934 and designed to be assembled and dismantled and used at exhibitions. It is not known how many were produced, and there is little evidence they ever reached more than prototype stage. A replica (constructed using the original drawings) can be seen at the Avoncroft Museum (Bromsgrove, Worcestershire), as part of its National Telephone Kiosk Collection.

=== K6 ===
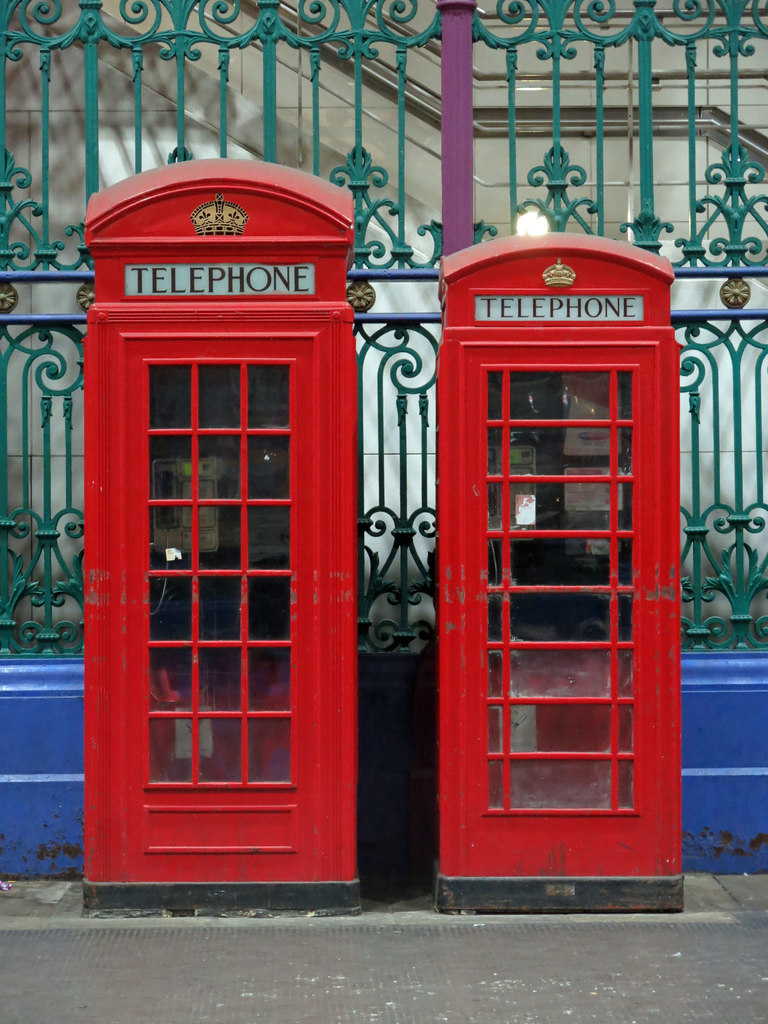
A K2 (left) and K6 (right) together in Smithfield Market, London

In 1935 the K6 was designed to commemorate the Silver Jubilee of George V. It was consequently sometimes known as the "Jubilee" kiosk. It went into production in 1936. The K6 was the first red telephone kiosk to be extensively used outside London, and many thousands were deployed in virtually every town and city, replacing most of the existing kiosks and establishing thousands of new sites. In 1935 there had been 19,000 public telephones in the UK: by 1940, thanks to the K6, there were 35,000.

The design was again by Scott, and was essentially a smaller and more streamlined version of the K2, intended to be produced at a considerably cheaper cost, and to occupy less pavement space. The principal differences between the two designs were:

- Size. The K6 was 8 feet 3 inches (2.51 m) tall and weighed 13.5 cwt (0.69 tonnes). This compared with 9 feet 3 inches (2.82 m) and 1.25 tons (1.27 tonnes) for the K2.
- Elements of the design were simplified and streamlined, in keeping with the "moderne" aesthetics of the 1930s. The Grecian fluting was removed from the door and window surrounds, and the previously separate pediment and frieze were merged.
- The Crown motif (see below), which had previously been pierced through the ironwork to give ventilation, was now embossed in bas-relief. A new, separate ventilation slot was provided.
- A new glazing pattern was introduced. The door and two glazed sides of the K2 each had 18 equal-sized panes of glass arranged in 6 rows of 3. In the K6 the number of rows was increased to 8, and the central column of panes was made considerably wider than those to either side. This improved visibility, and gave a more horizontal appearance to the windows, again in keeping with "moderne" principles.

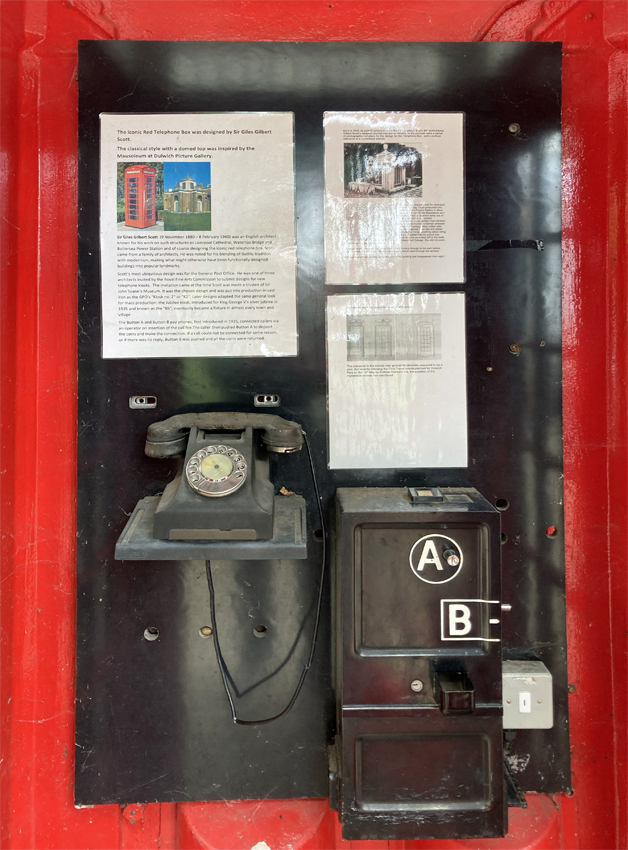
Original phone and coin box in a red telephone box

The K6 has since become a British icon, but it was not universally loved at the start. The red colour caused particular local difficulties and there were many requests for less visible colours. The Post Office was forced into allowing a less strident grey with red glazing bars scheme for areas of natural and architectural beauty. Ironically, some of these areas that have preserved their telephone boxes have now painted them red. The paint colour used most widely today is known as "currant red" and is defined by a British Standard, BS381C-Red539.

==== Kiosk installation: the early years ====
With continued demand for K6 kiosks, siting them was more widespread than ever before. A purpose built kiosk trailer was designed from 1953 to reduce the running costs of cranes.

==== Numbers installed ====
The K6 was the most abundant kiosk in the UK and its growth, from 1935, can be seen from the BT archives:

| Period | Number | Notes |
|---|---|---|
| 1925– | 1,000 | K1 only |
| 1930– | 8,000 | K2 & K3 added |
| 1935– | 19,000 | K6 introduced |
| 1940– | 35,000 | |
| 1950– | 44,000 | |
| 1960– | 64,000 | |
| 1970– | 70,000 | K8 introduced in 1968 |
| 1980– | 73,000 | |

=== Manufacture ===
The K1 and the later K3 concrete kiosks were produced at various (and largely unrecorded) locations, around the country. This made quality control and supervision of the manufacturing process difficult, when compared to the GPO's experience with cast-iron post boxes, and was an important aspect of the GPO's move towards cast-iron telephone kiosks. Over the years, five foundries were involved in this work for the Post Office. Lion Foundry in Kirkintilloch, MacFarlane (Saracen Foundry), and Carron Ironworks near Falkirk all produced batches of the K2, the K6 and the K8. Carron produced the single batch of K4 kiosks. The other two manufacturers were McDowall Steven and Bratt Colbran, both of which produced only relatively small batches of the pre-war Mk1 K6.

Many kiosks have been fitted with replacement backs; unmodified examples usually have the identity of their manufacturer marked on a plate on the outside at the bottom of their back panel. The only exceptions are the few Mk1 models made by Bratt Colbran, which are anonymous. A supplementary way of identifying the manufacturer is by means of casting marks on the various component parts – i.e. LF, CC, MF, MS and BC – which were used to various extents over the years. A more consistent manufacturer mark can be found at about shoulder height on the inner face of the back panel. These marks generally identify both the manufacturer and the precise model of kiosk. Up to around 1949, the year of manufacture is also included. The non-BT K6 kiosks erected later, usually painted black, are for the most part new castings from new manufacturers.

=== Crown ===
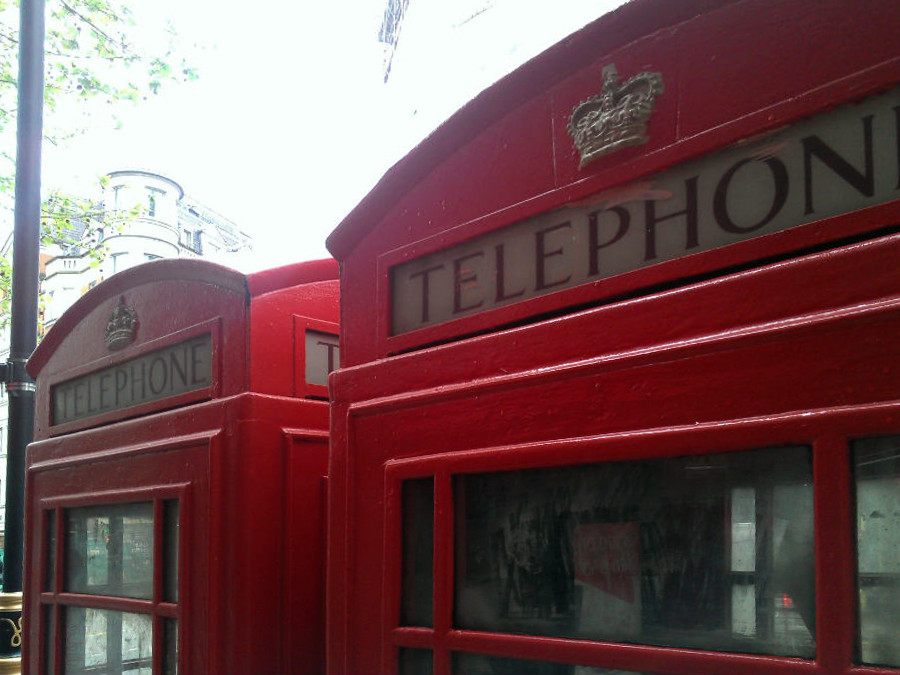
K6s, Charing Cross Road, London, showing different styles of crown: the Tudor Crown, in use 1936–1953 (left); and St Edward's Crown on separate plate, 1955 or later (right).

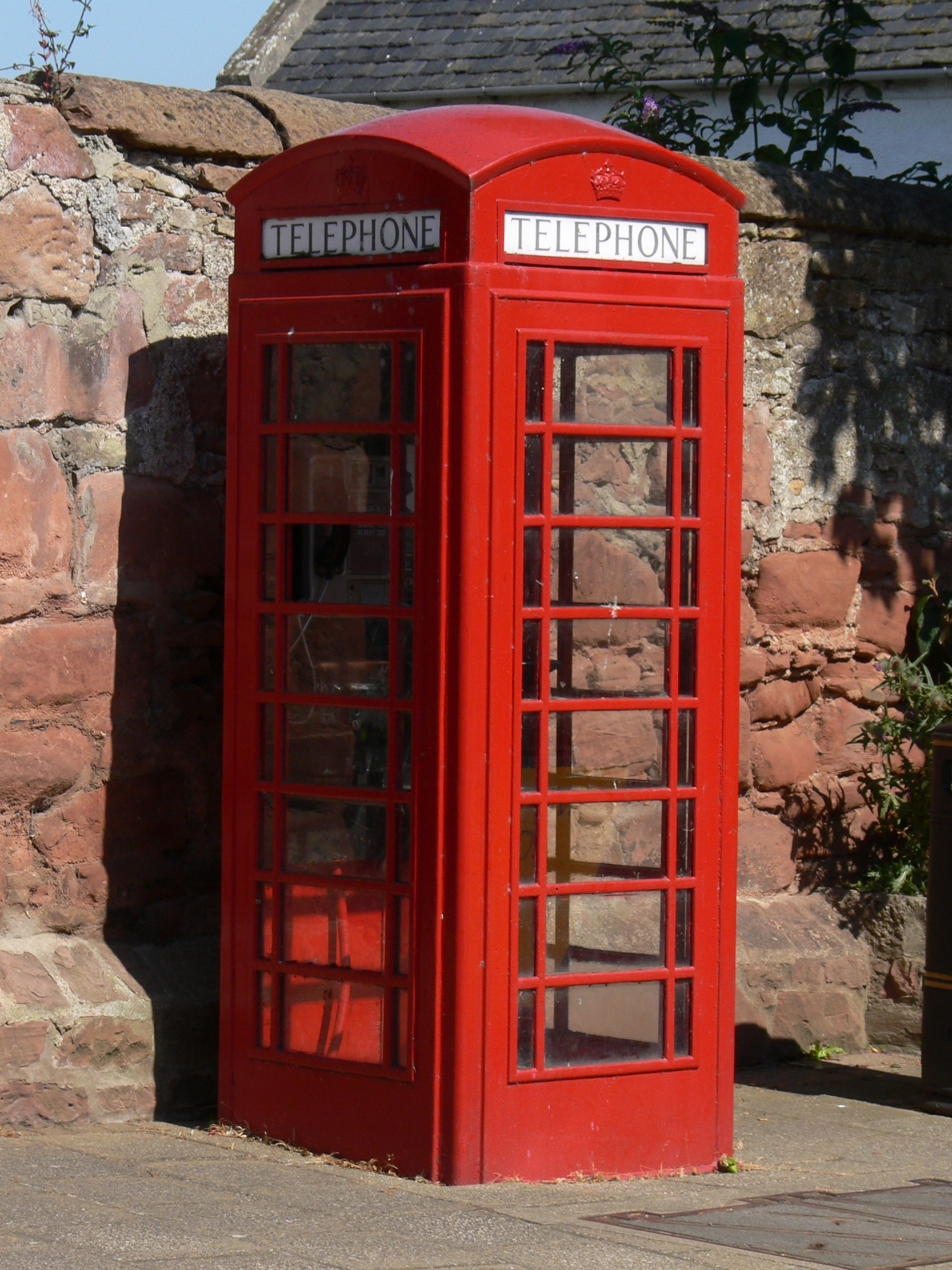
K6 kiosk in Cromarty in the Scottish Highlands using the Crown of Scotland

From 1926 onwards, the fascias of Post Office kiosks were emblazoned with a prominent crown, representing the British Government, of which the Post Office was an agency. The design was initially the Tudor Crown, then in widespread use in government service. The same crown was used in all parts of the United Kingdom and British Empire. On the K2, the design was pierced through the ironwork, and acted as a ventilation hole. On the K6, a separate ventilation slot was provided, and the crown was embossed in bas-relief.

In 1953 the new Queen, Elizabeth II, decided to replace the Tudor Crown in all contexts with a representation of the actual crown used for most English, and later British, coronations, St Edward's Crown; it began to appear on the fascias of K6 kiosks.

St Edward's Crown was initially used on kiosks in all parts of the United Kingdom. However, in Scotland, following protests over the use of English insignia, the Post Office (like other government agencies there) began to use, from 1955, a representation of the actual Crown of Scotland. To accommodate the two different designs of crown on K6 kiosks, the fascia sections were cast with a slot in them, into which a plate bearing the appropriate crown was inserted before the roof section was fitted.

The crowns were originally painted the same red as the rest of the box. However, since the early 1990s, when the heritage value of red kiosks began to be widely recognised, British Telecom picked out the crowns (on both K2s and K6s) in gold paint.

Kiosks installed in Kingston upon Hull were not fitted with a crown, as those kiosks were installed by the Hull Corporation (later Hull City Council, then Kingston Communications). All boxes in Hull were also painted in cream.

=== Modernisation – K7, K8 and "Croydon" ===
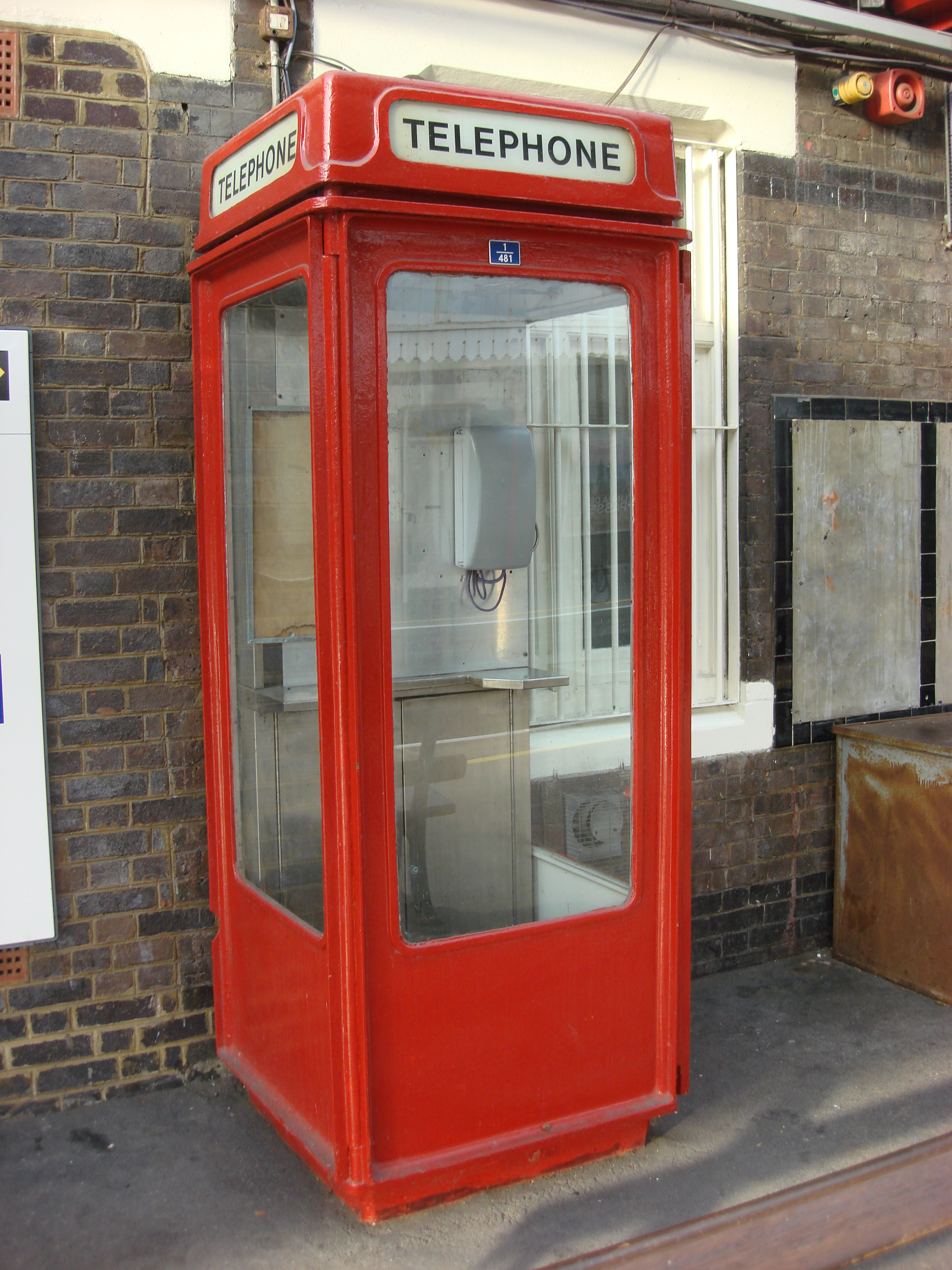
K8 Mk2 box at Amersham station, installed as part of the London Underground's internal telephone system

In 1959, architect Neville Conder was commissioned to design a new box. The K7 design went no further than the prototype stage. K8, introduced in 1968, was designed by Bruce Martin. It was used primarily for new sites; around 11,000 were installed, replacing earlier models only when they needed relocating or had been damaged beyond repair. The K8 retained a red colour scheme, but it was a different shade of red: a slightly brighter "Poppy Red", which went on to become the standard colour across all kiosks.

The K8 featured a single large glass panel on two sides and the door. While improving visibility and illumination inside the box, these were vulnerable to damage. There were two versions, the Mk1 and the Mk2, differing mainly in the detail of the roof and the surround of the 'TELEPHONE' opals.

In order to create a new box with easier access, lower maintenance and brighter lighting, the Post Office introduced a prototype run of "Croydon" telephone boxes from 1972, so-named as they were erected in Croydon. The Croydon boxes, painted bright yellow with a black handset silhouette, were erected as an experimental prototype to replace the red telephone boxes. However, although the trials were successful, the quality of the materials and design made it too expensive for the Post Office to mass-produce, and the design was not adopted.

=== Privatisation and the KX series ===
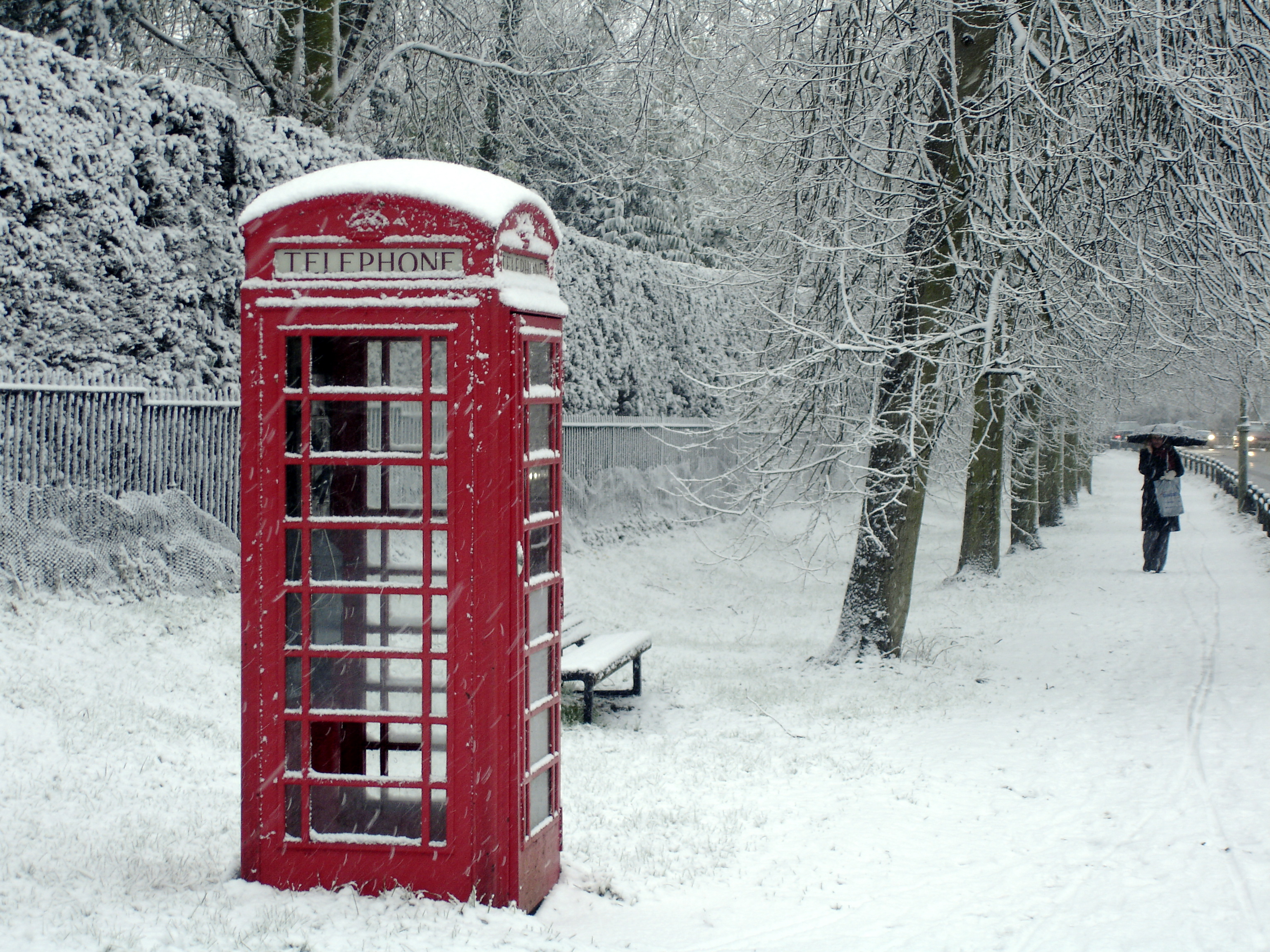
When BT was privatised by the British government in 1984, existing telephone boxes retained their distinctive red colour (K6 pictured in Cambridge, England in 2007), and around 2,000 of them were given listed status.

In 1980, in preparation for privatisation, Post Office Telephones was rebranded as British Telecom (BT). In February 1981, the Daily Telegraph mistakenly announced that all the red telephone boxes would be repainted yellow, which was BT's new corporate colour. Despite the fact only 80 or so kiosks in the North West, and 4 in London had been painted yellow as a trial, there was an immediate public outcry; the Daily Mail launched a campaign "against the yellow peril" and questions were asked in Parliament. In the House of Lords, the Earl of Gowrie, the Minister of State for Employment, called on BT "to abandon this ridiculous scheme". In the House of Commons, Mark Lennox-Boyd MP asked Prime Minister Margaret Thatcher if she would treat the decision "with the greatest possible dismay". Thatcher, who was responsible for the privatisation, would only say that she could "see my honourable Friend's point". Shortly afterwards, BT announced that only 90 of the 77,000 remaining traditional boxes had been painted different colours "as an experiment" and that no final decision had been reached.

After privatisation in 1984, British Telecom introduced the KX100, a more utilitarian design, which began to replace most of the existing boxes. The KX100 was one of a series of designs, including the wheelchair-accessible open-sided KX200, and the triangular-footprint KX300. In January 1985, Nick Kane, the Director of Marketing for BT Local Communications Services announced that the old red telephone boxes would be replaced because they "...no longer meet the needs of our customers. Few people like to use them. They are expensive and difficult to clean and maintain and cannot be used by handicapped people". This time, BT did not relent, despite another vociferous campaign.

Many local authorities used legislation designed to protect buildings of architectural or historic importance to keep old telephone boxes in prominent locations and around 2,000 of them were given listed status. Several thousand others were left on low-revenue mostly rural sites, but many thousands of recovered K2 and K6 boxes were sold off. Some kiosks have been converted to be used as shower cubicles in private homes. In Kingston upon Thames a number of old K6 boxes were used to form a work of art resembling a row of fallen dominoes. In January 2020 it was estimated that 8,000 traditional red telephone boxes remained in public service. The KX+, better known as the KX100 PLUS, introduced in 1996 had a domed roof reminiscent of the familiar K2 and K6. Subsequent designs departed significantly from the old-style red boxes. BT followed the KX series with the Multi.phone in 1999 and the ST6 in 2007.

=== InLinkUK ===
BT is one of the partners in InLinkUK, a communications service intended to replace over 1,000 payphones in major UK cities. The InLink stations, renamed "Street Hubs" by BT after InLinkUK Ltd failed, provide free public Wi-Fi, phone calls and device charging.

== Later use ==
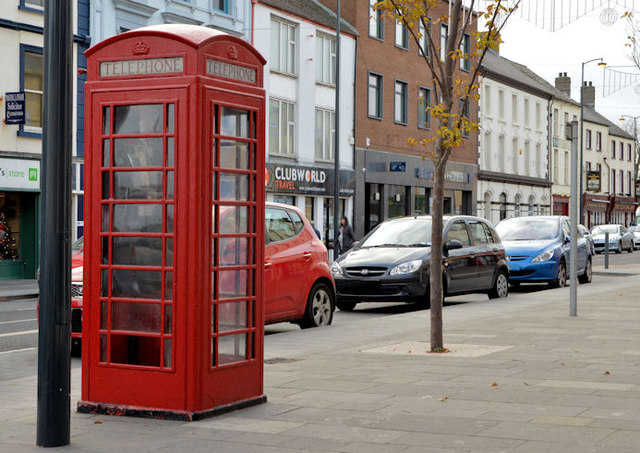
K6 in Carrickfergus high street, Northern Ireland in 2013

In 1990, phone boxes peaked at about 100,000. In 2021, 21,000 remained in use. Regulator Ofcom has protected 5,000 public phone boxes around the UK from closure where there are high accident rates—e.g. mountain rescue—or poor mobile telephone coverage. Some are required to have battery support in case of power cuts. Ofcom's criteria to protect a phone box from removal are: its location is not covered by all four main mobile networks; or it is located at an accident or suicide hotspot; or at least 52 calls have been made from it over the past 12 months; or exceptional circumstances require a public call box. BT and Kcom, which maintain phone boxes, could propose to remove boxes that did not meet one of these criteria, subject to formally consulting local communities first. After Storm Arwen in 2021 communities lost power and mobile phone service, and reported that they wished they still had their phone box.

Payphone use had dropped from about 800 million minutes in 2002 to 7 million in 2020, as 96% of UK adults had a mobile phone. In the year to May 2020 about 5 million calls were made from phone boxes, with 150,000 to emergency services, 25,000 to protection service ChildLine, and 20,000 to the suicide protection service Samaritans.

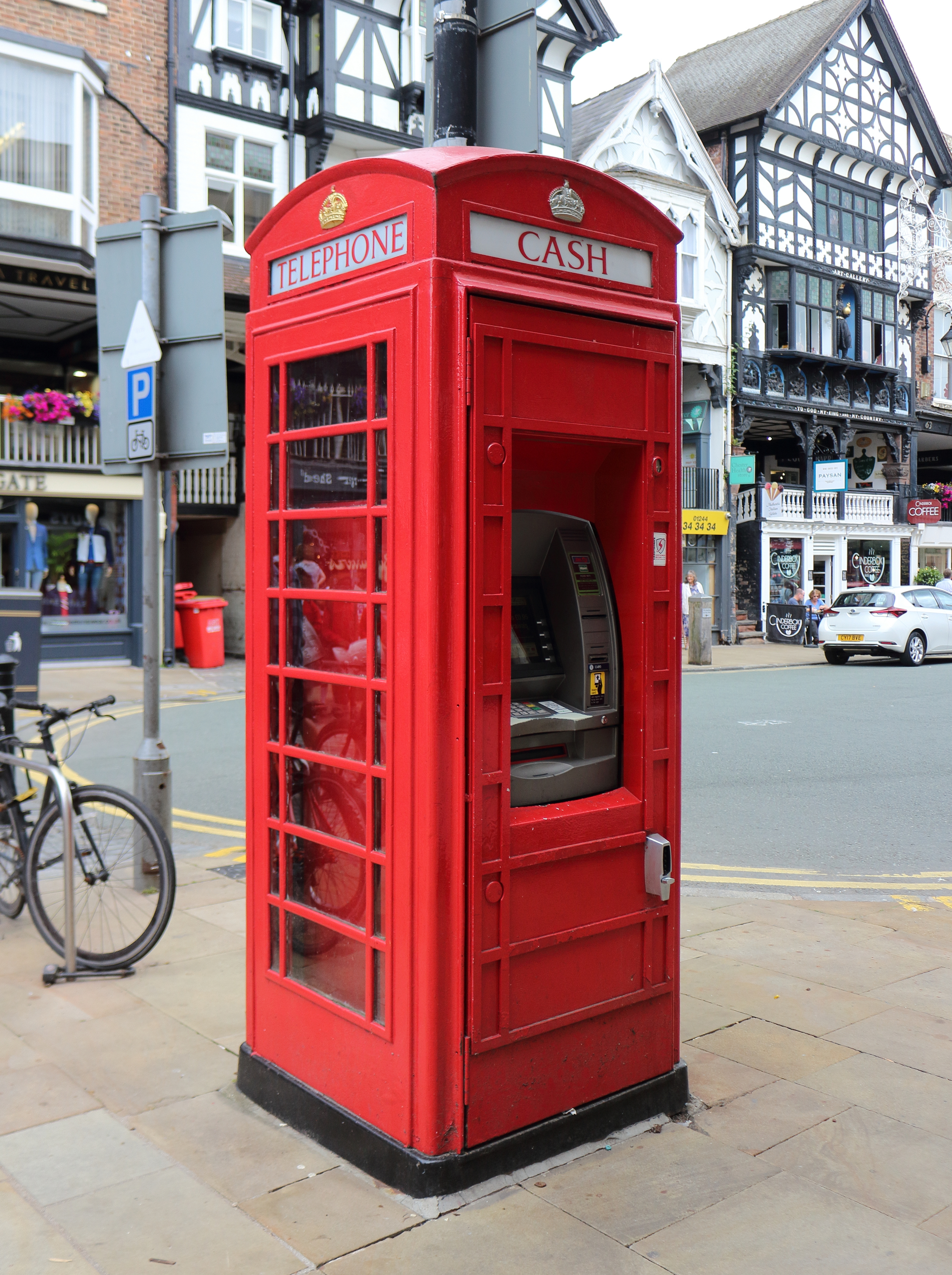
K6 converted into an ATM in Chester, Cheshire

As organisations can buy a red phone box for £1 for other uses, over 6,000 have been converted to community libraries, to house public defibrillators, and for other purposes. BT has converted some into cash machines (ATMs). One has been converted into an aquarium. Some boxes are rented out for an initial fee of thousands of pounds, then perhaps £400 a month—a box with plenty of passing traffic can be a good place to make sales from.

Phone boxes have always been unprofitable, even in their heyday, and more so following the collapse in usage; vandalism was common, and boxes full of money an invitation to theft.

=== Adoption ===
Little-used red telephone boxes can be adopted by parish councils in England for other uses. Some examples are shown below. The kiosk may be used for any legal purpose other than telephony and the contract of sale includes the following clause 5.5.4:

The buyer shall covenant not to sell, lease or license the Goods to a competitor to the Seller nor to permit a competitor to install electronic communications apparatus (as defined in schedule 2 of the Telecommunications Act 1984) within the Goods or itself (as the Buyer) shall not install, provide or operate any form of electronic communications apparatus (as defined in schedule 2 of the Telecommunications Act 1984) within the Goods.

It is likely that BT wishes to prohibit the kiosk from being re-used for electronic communications because they retain trade mark rights in the boxes in relation to telecommunication services and such use might be assumed to be provided by BT, which would confuse consumers as to the source of the services provided. In the US, there is an active movement seeking new telecom uses for little-used telephone booths, for example as wi-fi hotspots.

=== Libraries ===
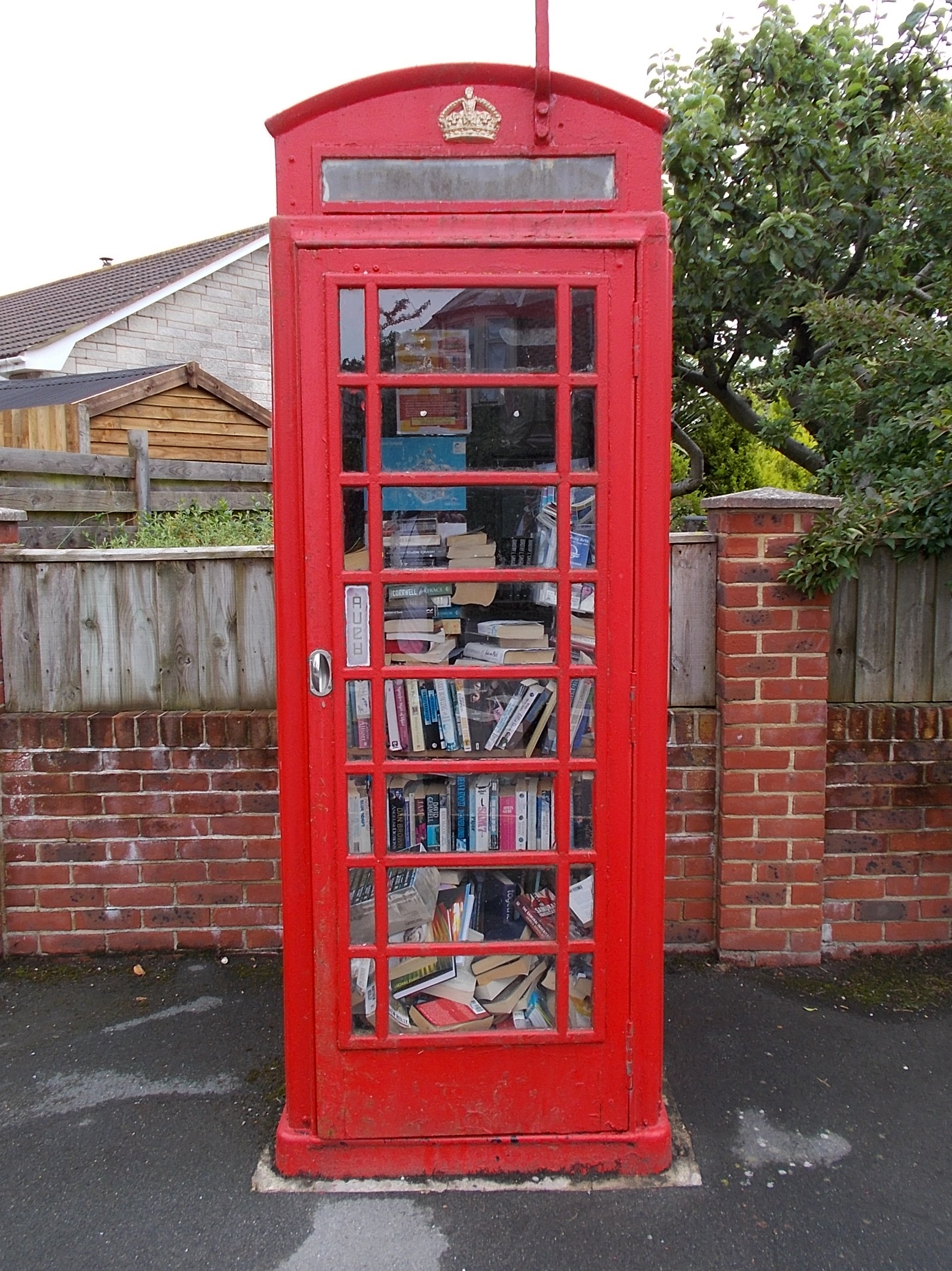
Decommissioned phone box converted into a mini-library, Whitwell, Isle of Wight, England

During 2009 a K6 in the village of Westbury-sub-Mendip in Somerset was converted into a library or book exchange replacing the services of the mobile library which no longer visits the village. Similar libraries now exist in the villages of North Cadbury in Somerset, Great Budworth in Cheshire and other locations. One such box was donated by Cumbernauld's town twinning association and installed as a library in Bron, France. The Telephone Box Book Exchange in Cutnall Green opened in June 2016.

Another K6 stands in Barga, Italy, where it is used as a BookCrossing library. It was donated in 2008 by a couple from Edinburgh, Scotland.

In Vittoriosa, Malta a K6 has also been converted into a mini-library.

=== Art gallery ===
Also in 2009, the town of Settle in North Yorkshire established the Gallery on the Green in a K6, which had been adopted by the Parish Council. The Gallery has featured a range of exhibitions of both notable artists and photographers (Tessa Bunney, Martin Parr, Mariana Cook) and local community groups. Its most famous contributor was Brian May, with his stereoscopic photography show 'A Village Lost and Found'.

=== Defibrillator ===
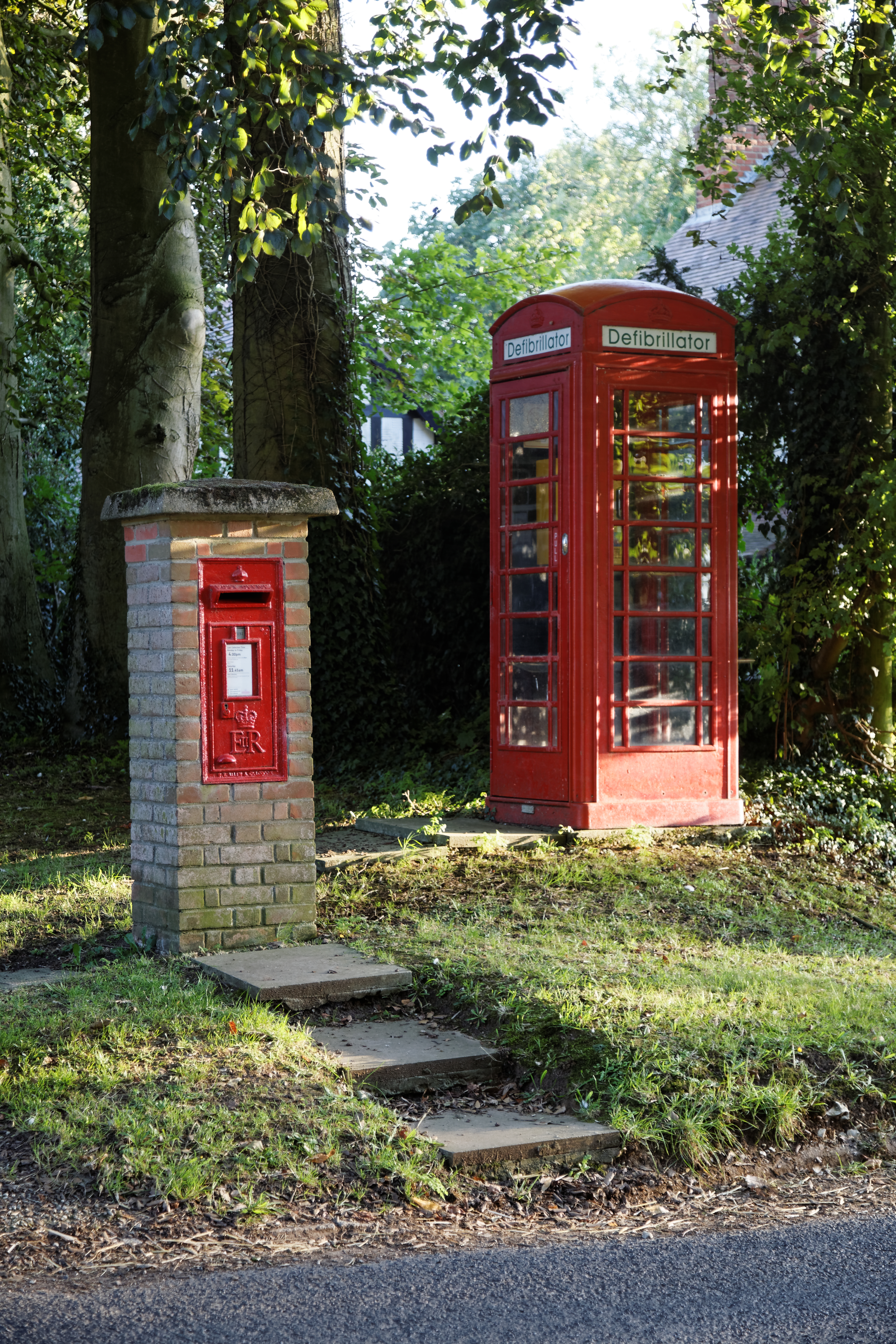
Defibrillator phone box, Brent Pelham, Hertfordshire

Following a competition by a Girl Guide unit in 2011 to find a use for their local disused telephone box in Glendaruel, Argyll, it has been fitted with a defibrillator. The equipment can be accessed only by following instructions from the Scottish Ambulance Service during an emergency call. The conversion of the box was paid for by BT under the Adopt A Kiosk scheme and the defibrillator was supplied by the Community Heartbeat Trust. Similar installations have been made in many other places, including Loweswater, Cumbria, Auchenblae, Aberdeenshire, Withernwick, East Riding of Yorkshire, and Witney, Oxfordshire.

=== Other ===
In 2010, in the village of Brookwood, Surrey, a project was initiated to restore and preserve the sole remaining K6 kiosk in the village. The kiosk had been adopted by Woking Borough Council in 2009 and a group of residents set about restoring the kiosk. This was achieved through private donations and sponsorship from local businesses. A blog detailed the restoration.

As of 2012, remanufactured units were offered for sale by X2Connect.

From October 2014, several of London's disused K6 telephone boxes have been painted green and converted to free mobile phone chargers named Solarboxes. They have been considered an outdoor kiosk alternative to indoor chargers such as the Chargebox.

== Usage elsewhere ==
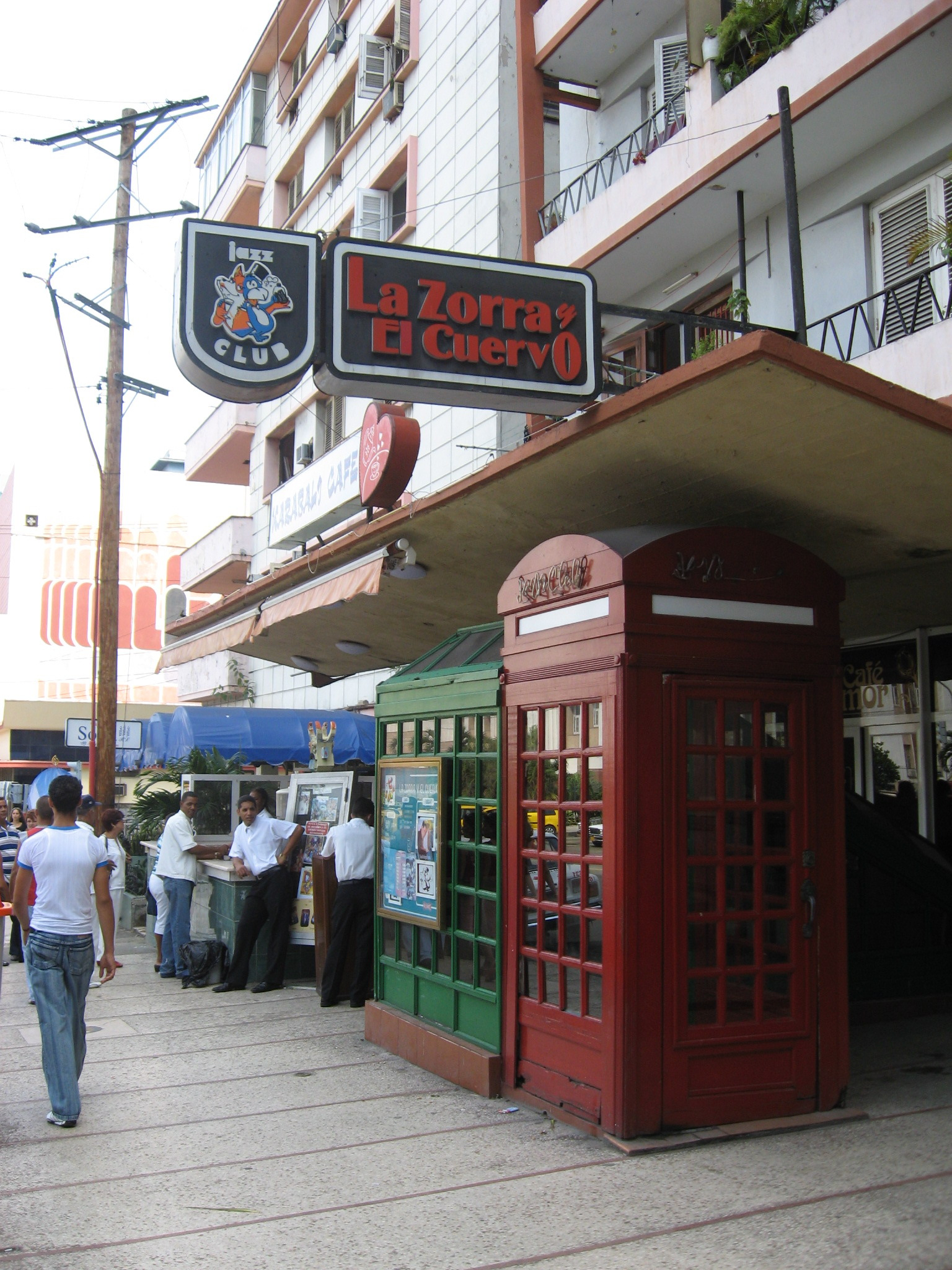
Imitation British-style box used as the entrance to a jazz club in Havana, Cuba

Several of these distinctive telephone boxes have been installed on the Norman, Oklahoma, campus of the University of Oklahoma, where they continue to serve their originally intended function. Elsewhere in the United States, a few have also been installed in downtown Glenview, Illinois, and Glencoe, Illinois. There is also one outside the British Embassy in Washington, D.C. A red telephone box can also be found on the Courthouse Square in Oxford, Mississippi. Two are in use in Tennessee: one is on the square in Collierville, Tennessee, and the other is located next to Pepper Palace in The Village Shops shopping centre in Gatlinburg, Tennessee. A telephone box sits outside The Poppy & Parliament restaurant on the courthouse square in Huntsville, Alabama.

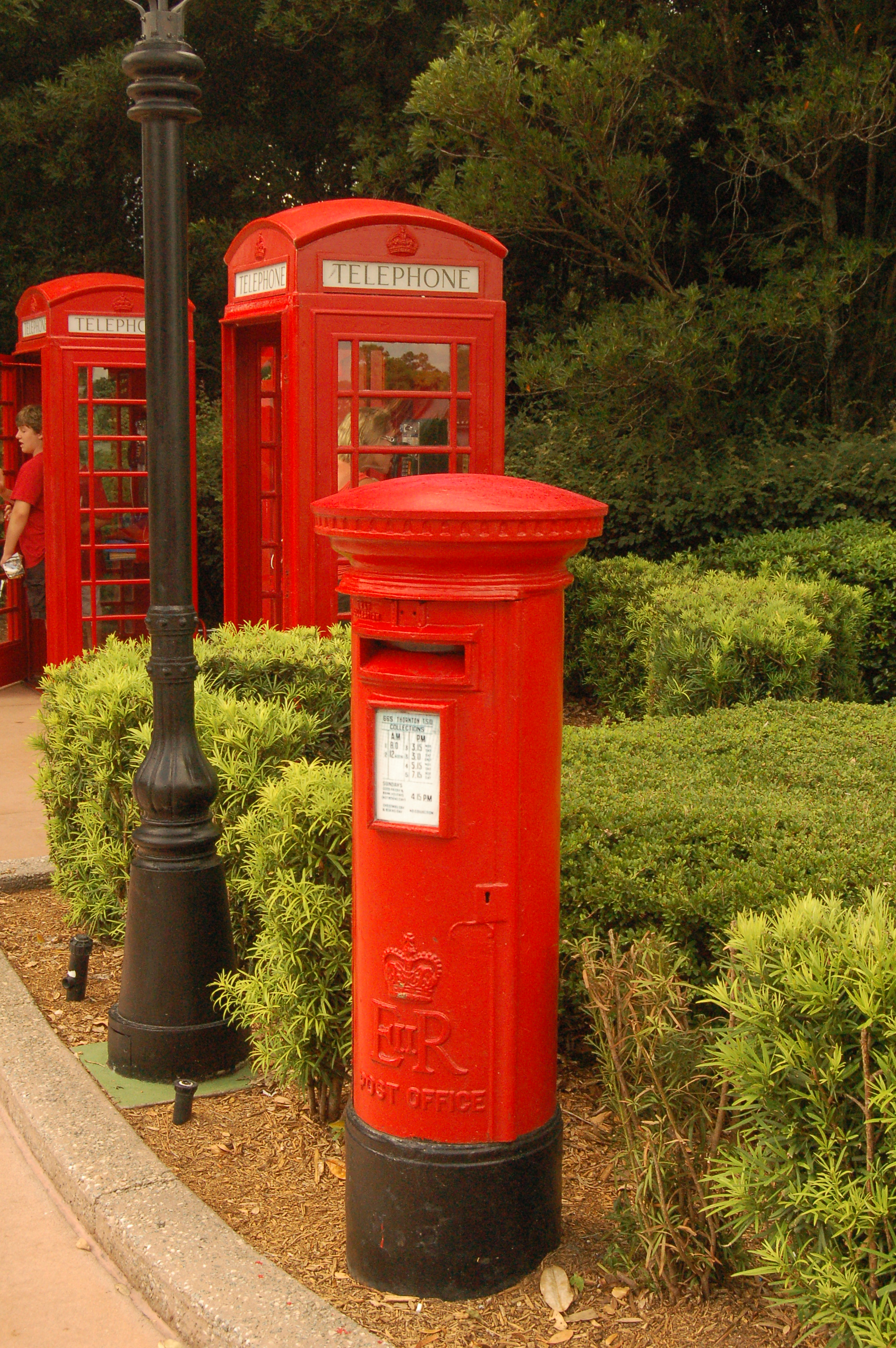
Two K6 telephone boxes and a pillar box at the United Kingdom Pavilion at Epcot in Walt Disney World Resort.

A red telephone box is in use in the student centre of the Massachusetts Institute of Technology. In addition, there is a red telephone box outside the town building (town hall/police station/post office) in the tiny mountain town of Rowe, Massachusetts, which is an original installation dating back to when the town of Rowe first got telephone service. Two red telephone boxes are on display at the World Showcase area of Disney's Epcot in Orlando, Florida, one located in the United Kingdom area and one in the Canada area. One is on display at English Gardens – A Place for Weddings in Winter Park close to downtown Orlando. An original K6 can also be found outside the Allied Building in Treasure Island, Florida. There are also a few red boxes at the Ellenton Outlet Mall, just off I-75, near Bradenton, Florida. These still have their original STD code cards in place and have working US payphone equipment. There is a red telephone box in Westminster, Maryland on the corner of West Main Street and Rt. 27 outside Johanson's Dining House. In Lake Havasu City, Arizona, a few K6s arrived when the old London Bridge was preserved there.

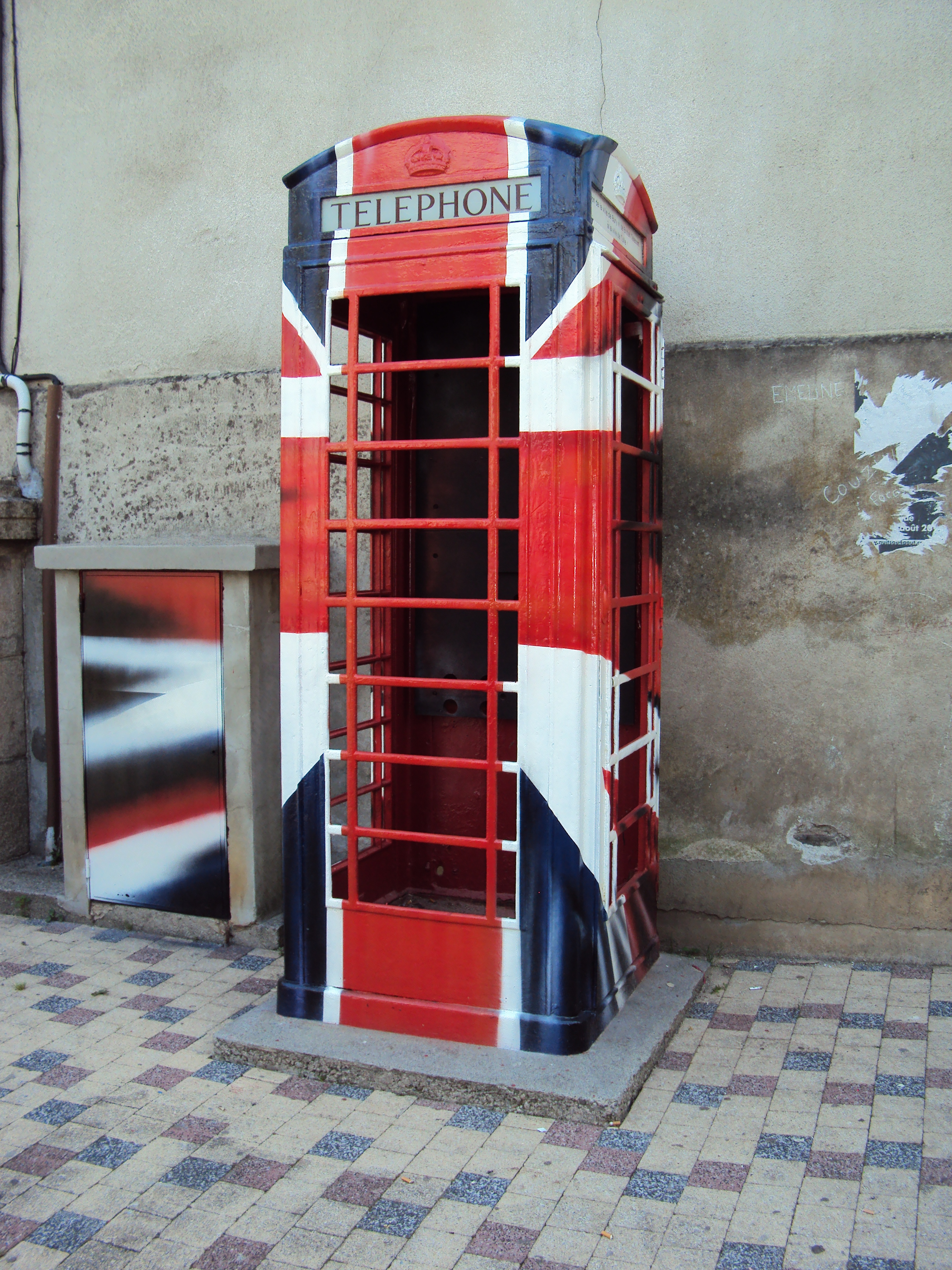
K6 with a Union Jack paint scheme in Corrèze, France

Australia and New Zealand each had their own design of red telephone box, and some examples have been preserved in sensitive or historic sites. A brief and colourful campaign was run to "save" the red telephone box in New Zealand by the Wizard of New Zealand. Many K3 phone boxes survive in Portugal, where they were exported by the Anglo-Portuguese Telephone Company, and where the climate was less harmful to their concrete fabric than in Britain. They are a common sight, for example, in the city of Porto. British K6 phone boxes are to be found, painted green, in the centre of Kinsale, a historic town in County Cork in the Republic of Ireland. Red telephone boxes are also found across Malta, some islands of the West Indies such as Antigua, Barbados, as well as in Cyprus, showing that the colonial influence is still present. In France, boxes can also be found on the border of Saint-Maurice (rue de Gravelle), close to Paris, and in the centre of the town of Chinon. In Germany, some stands in the towns of Bad Münstereifel, Bielefeld and Eppingen. Thames Town, an imitation English town on the outskirts of Shanghai, China includes red telephone boxes. In 2008, K6 telephone boxes were imported from the United Kingdom to the Israeli city of Petah Tikva and installed on its main street, Haim Ozer.

=== Kingston upon Hull ===
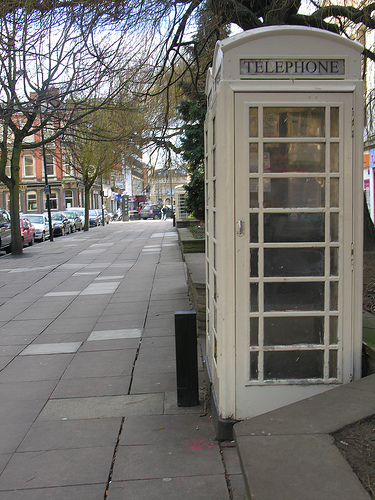
A Hull K6 white telephone box

Kingston upon Hull ran a municipal telephone system from 1904. There were several such municipal services in the UK, but whereas most had been brought under the Post Office monopoly by 1913, Hull's, being very efficient, was allowed to remain under the control of Hull Corporation (the city council). As a result, although the Corporation used K6 kiosks, they were painted cream and had the crown omitted from the design. The Hull telephone system was privatised in 1999 and taken over by Kingston Communications (KC; later renamed KCOM Group in 2007). In about 2007 KC removed many of the cream K6 boxes. After public complaints at the loss of heritage it was agreed that about 125 of the boxes would be retained, and they remain in use. KC also allocated limited numbers (around 1,000) for sale to the public and many were sold off even before they had been removed from service. Hull also continues to use K8 and KX100 PLUS kiosks, and in the past has used other non-GPO/BT designs. In 2023 Historic England designated nine of the cream boxes as Grade II listed structures.

=== Crown Dependencies ===
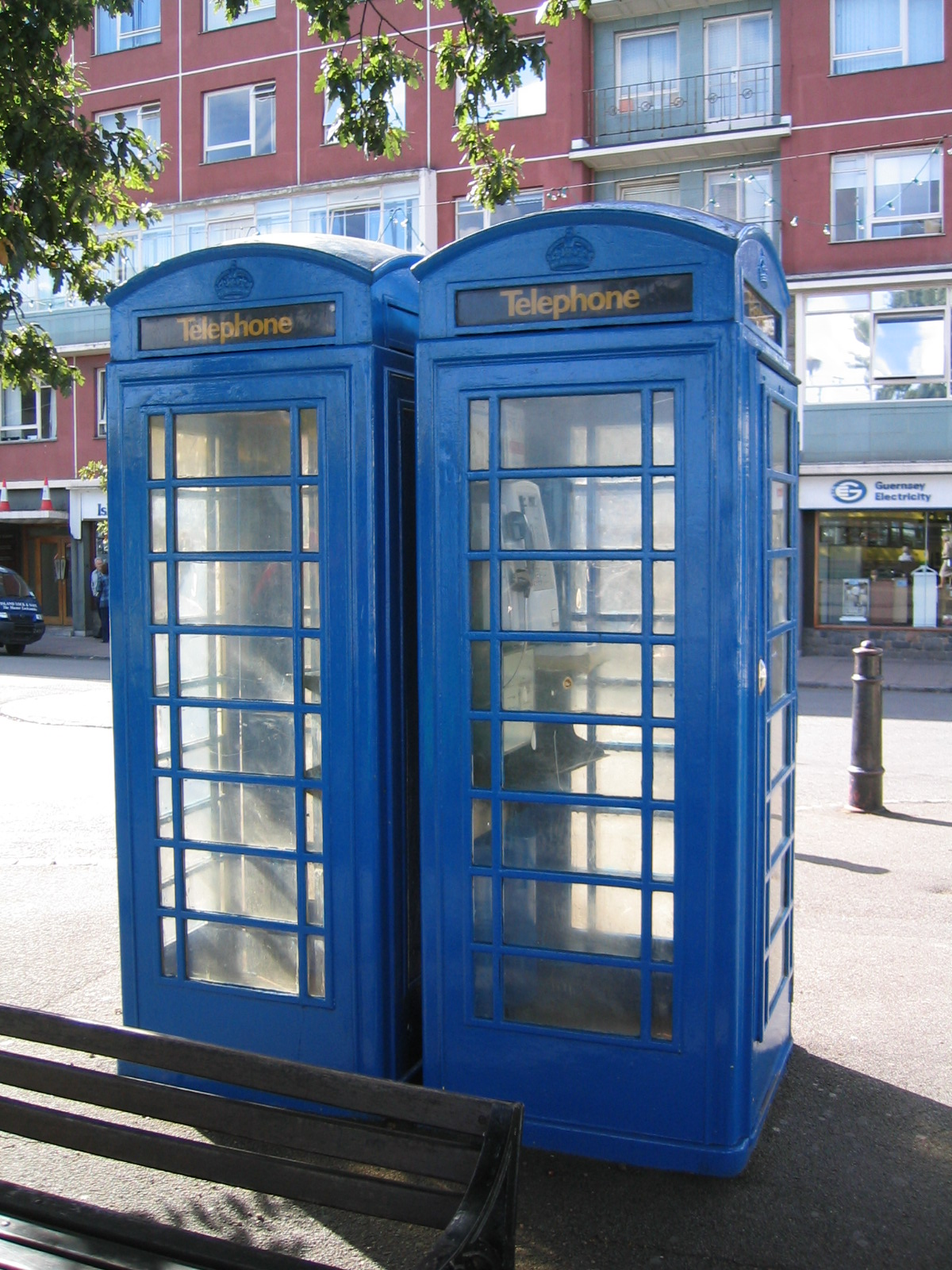
Blue telephone boxes in Guernsey in 2005

The telephone services of the Crown Dependencies were split at various times from the GPO.

==== Guernsey ====
Guernsey Telecoms painted its kiosks yellow with white window frames; they were repainted in blue when the company was sold to Cable and Wireless in 2002.

==== Jersey ====
Jersey Telecom used locally made kiosks, painted in just yellow, or cream and yellow.

==== Isle of Man ====
Manx Telecom has left its kiosks in the red colour used by its predecessors British Telecom and the GPO. The telephone box in Cregneash was temporarily painted green, but this was only for a film and the phone box is now red again.

=== Overseas territories ===
==== Cyprus ====
At least one red telephone box is present in Dhekelia.

==== Gibraltar ====
Gibtelecom operates red kiosks of various vintages.

== UK cultural landmark ==
=== Appearance in popular culture ===
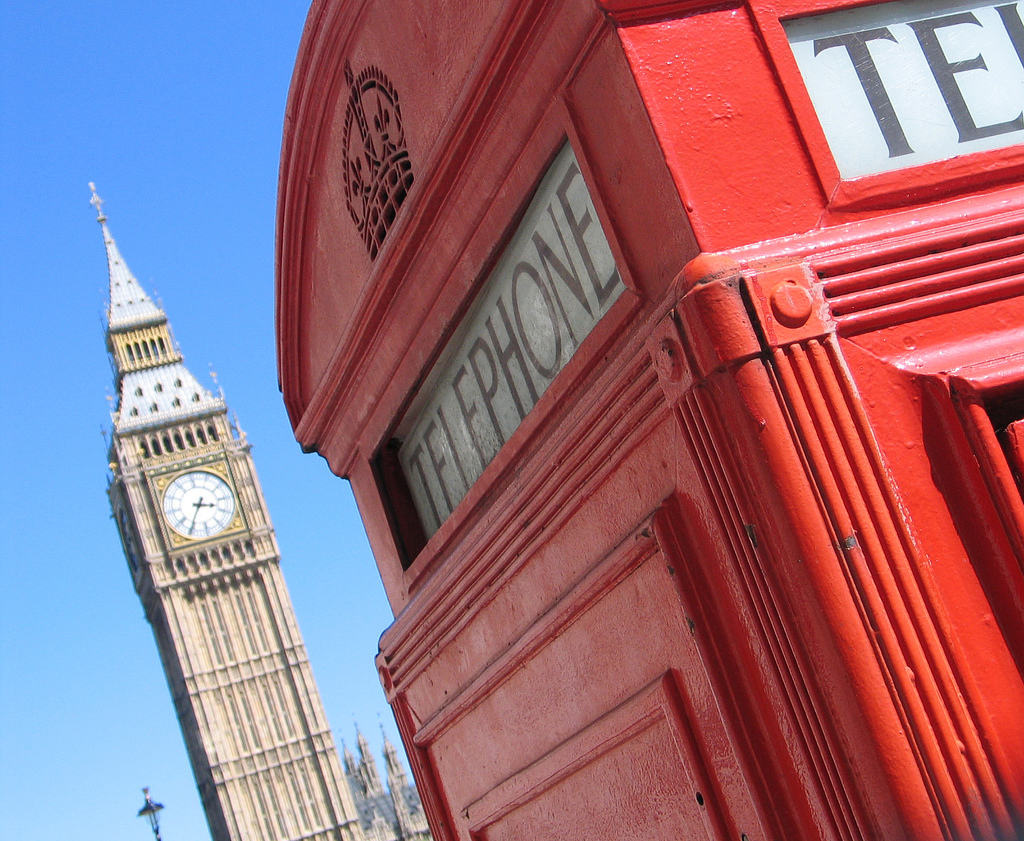
Two cultural landmarks of the United Kingdom

A cultural icon of the UK, the red telephone box has appeared in British pop culture. In music it has featured in Adele's video for the 2015 single "Hello", the front cover of One Direction's 2012 album Take Me Home, and the back cover of David Bowie's album The Rise and Fall of Ziggy Stardust and the Spiders from Mars (1972). It was the subject of the 1980 single "Red Frame/White Light" by OMD. It also featured in Peter Gabriel’s 1993 tour Secret World Live, being on stage for the opening of the show, and used in the song "Come Talk to Me". A phone receiver also features on the live album cover.

In film it features in Alfred Hitchcock's thriller Blackmail (1929) when Frank (John Longden) reveals a glove that Alice (Anny Ondra) left behind at the scene of a murder inside the phone box of her father’s tobacco store. It appears in a scene in the 1955 black comedy The Ladykillers where a motley gang of crooks led by Professor Marcus (Alec Guinness) cram into one. In the gangland drama Get Carter (1971), Jack Carter (Michael Caine) makes a critical call from a phone box in his hometown. In the cult black comedy Withnail and I (1987), Withnail (Richard E. Grant) calls his agent from a telephone box, and complains about its coin-operated system. A red phone box near Scotland Yard appears in Harry Potter and the Order of the Phoenix (2007) as Harry Potter and Arthur Weasley enter the Ministry of Magic.

In 2016, British chef Gordon Ramsay opened a British-themed fish restaurant in the Las Vegas Strip, with the doors to the entrance resembling the red telephone box.

=== Use in contemporary art ===
==== Out of Order ====
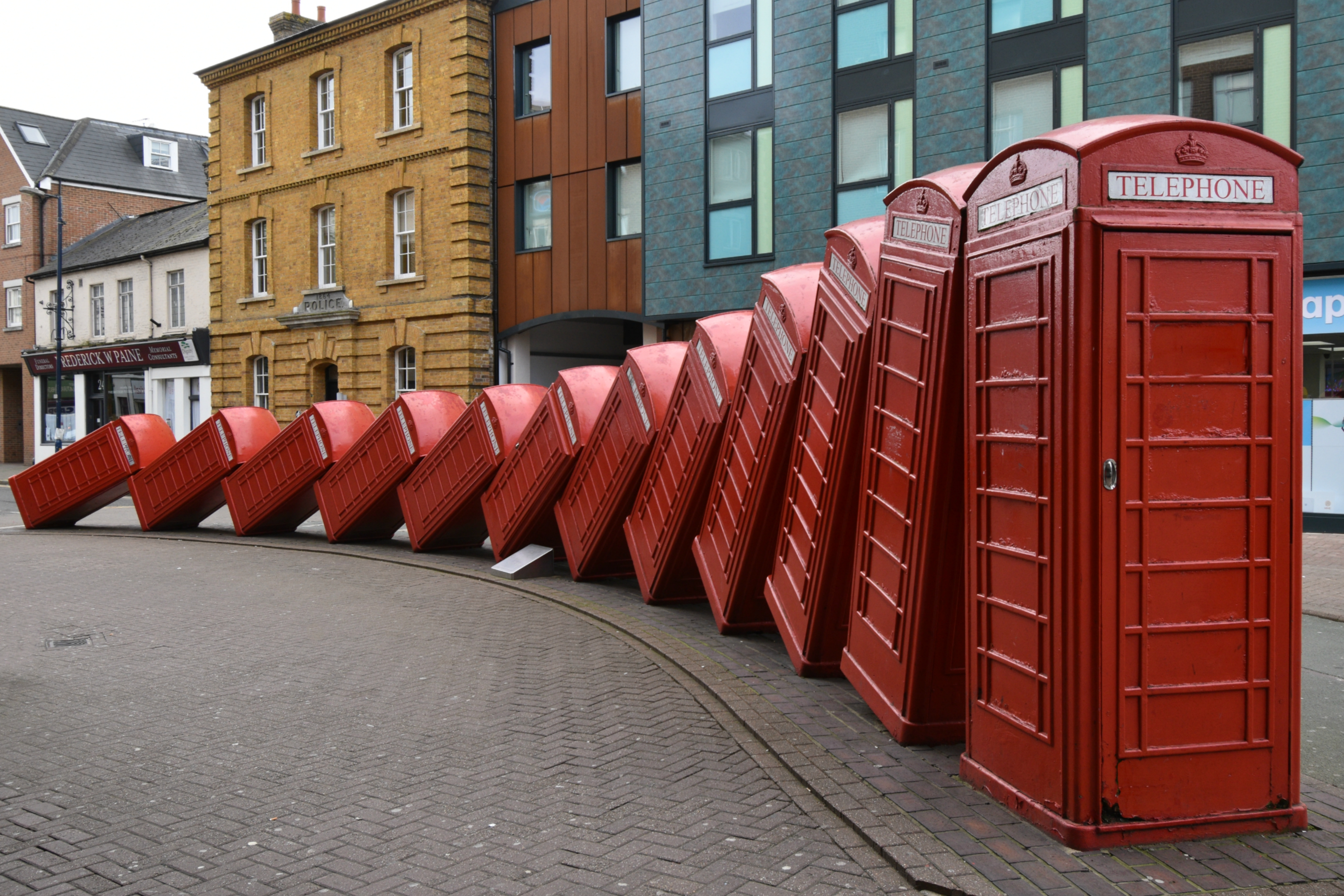
Out of Order by David Mach in Kingston upon Thames, London

Scottish sculptor David Mach created the permanent public work Out of Order in 1989 in Kingston upon Thames, London. It takes the form of a row of twelve K6 telephone boxes, the first one upright, the others gradually falling over like dominoes. It was originally intended that the last upright box was to contain a working telephone.

==== BT Artboxes ====
In 2012, BT helped celebrate the 25th anniversary of the UK's free-phone charity ChildLine by commissioning eighty artists to design and decorate full-sized K6 replicas. These were displayed in public spaces across London and then auctioned by Sotheby's as BT Artboxes. Artists included Peter Blake, Willie Christie, David Mach, Denis Masi, Zaha Hadid and Ian Ritchie.

==== Olympic Park ====
A number of sculptures made from disassembled telephone boxes were installed by AOC Architects in London's Olympic Park for the 2012 Summer Olympics.

== Image gallery ==
GPO/BT telephone kiosks

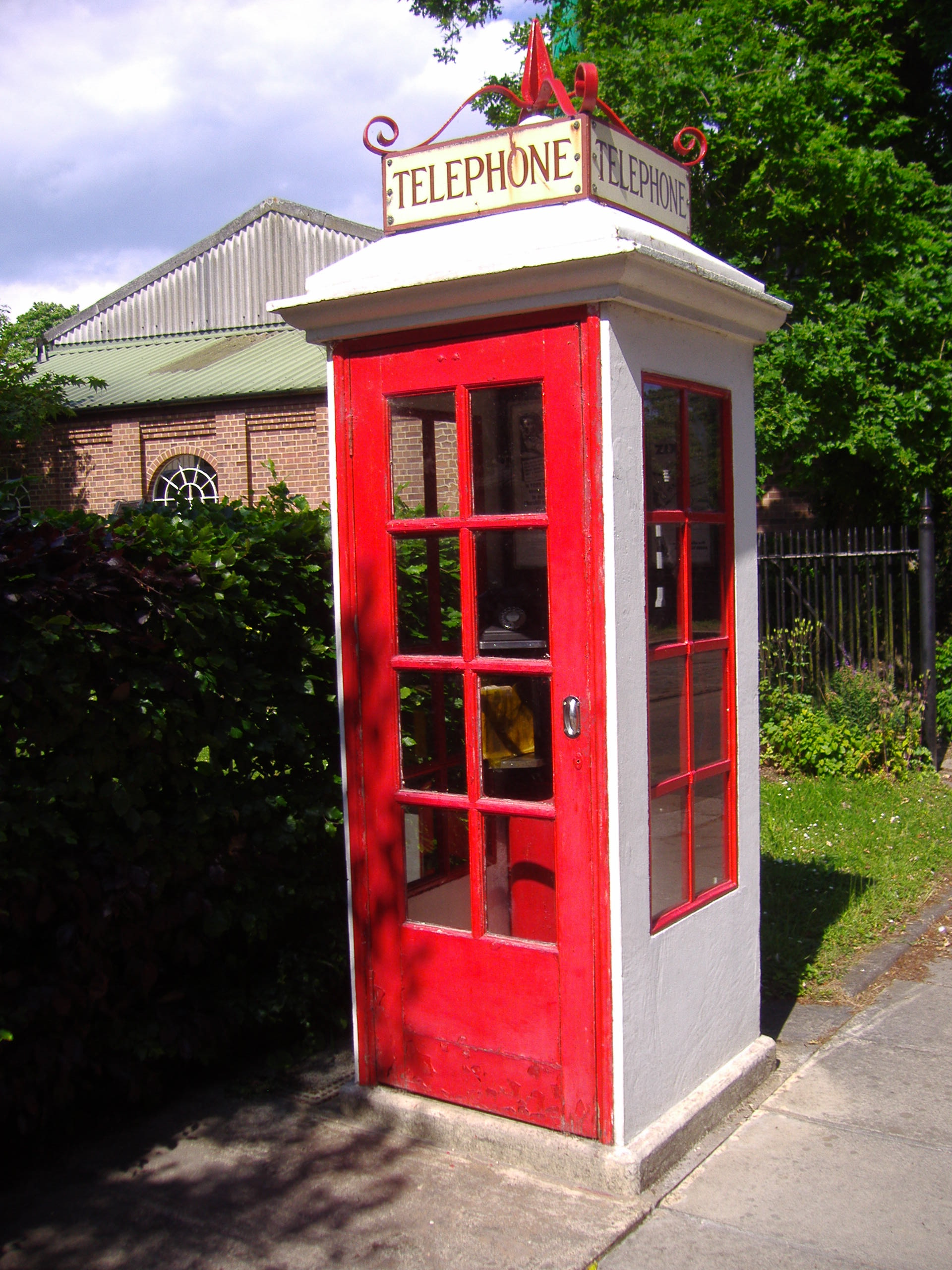
K1 Telephone Box, Lowestoft Transport Museum

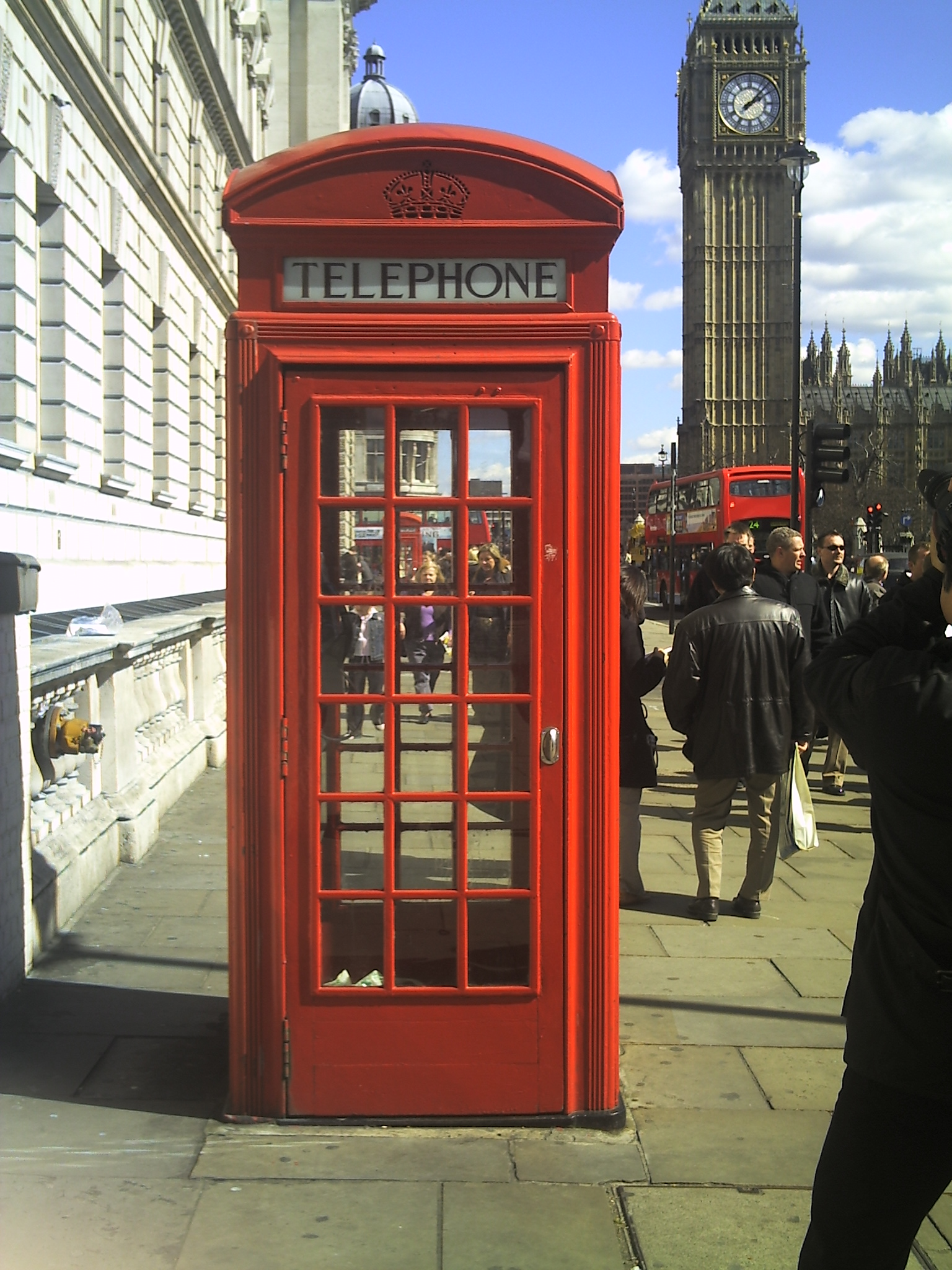
K2 with Elizabeth Tower in the background

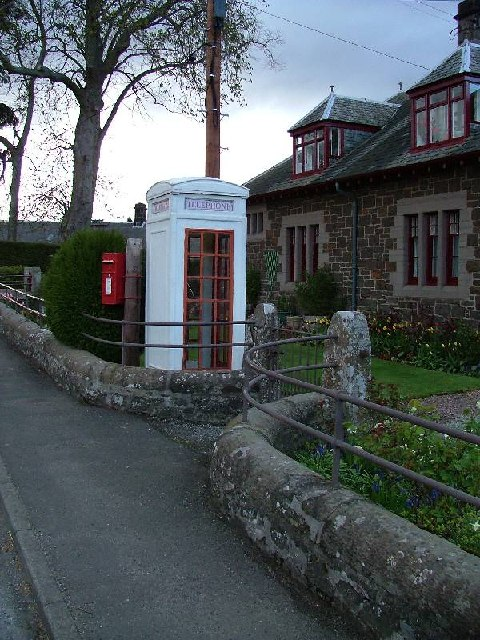
The only K3 Mk2 kiosk still in use, near Rhynd in Perth and Kinross, Scotland

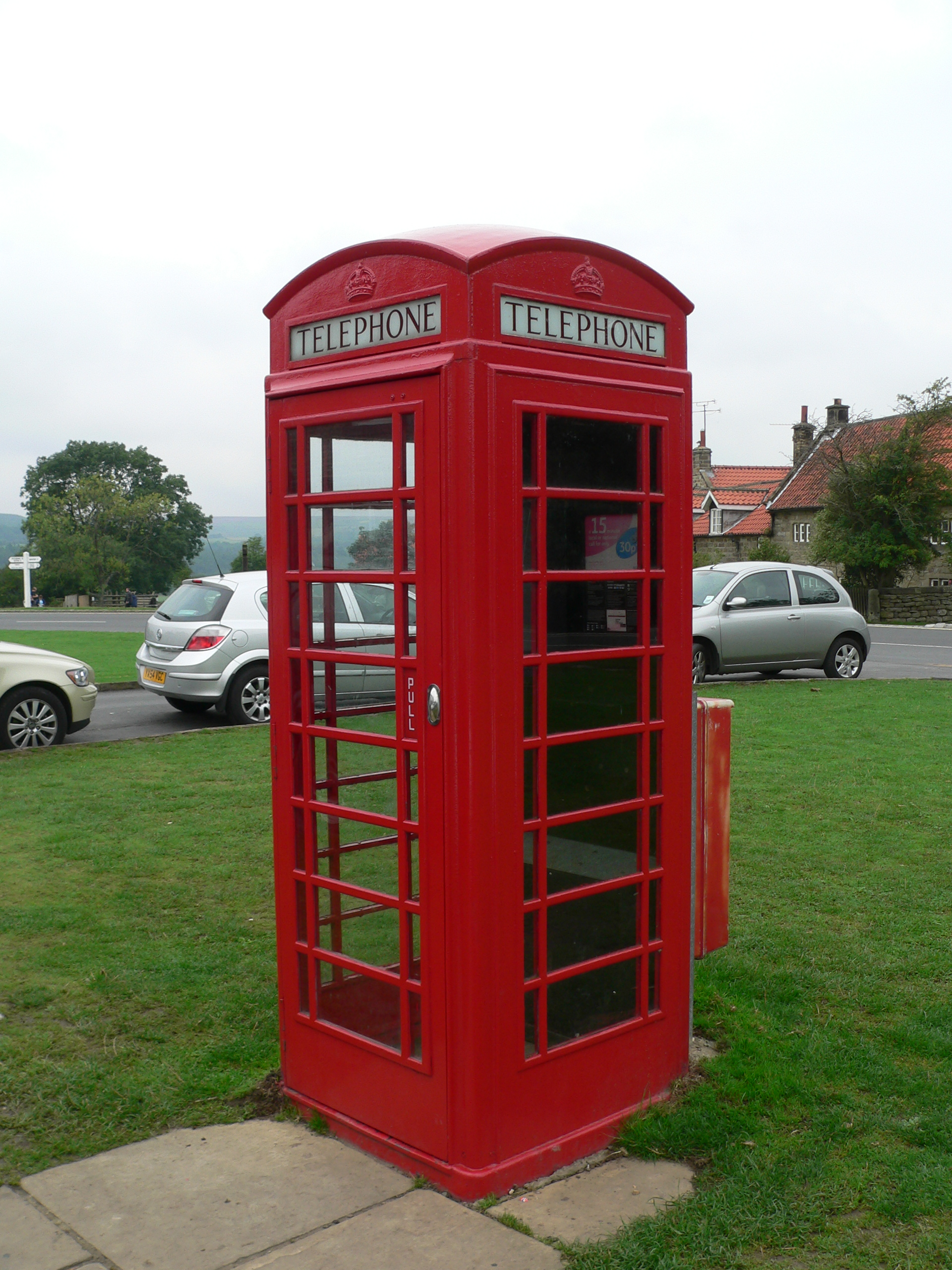
K6 in Goathland, North Yorkshire

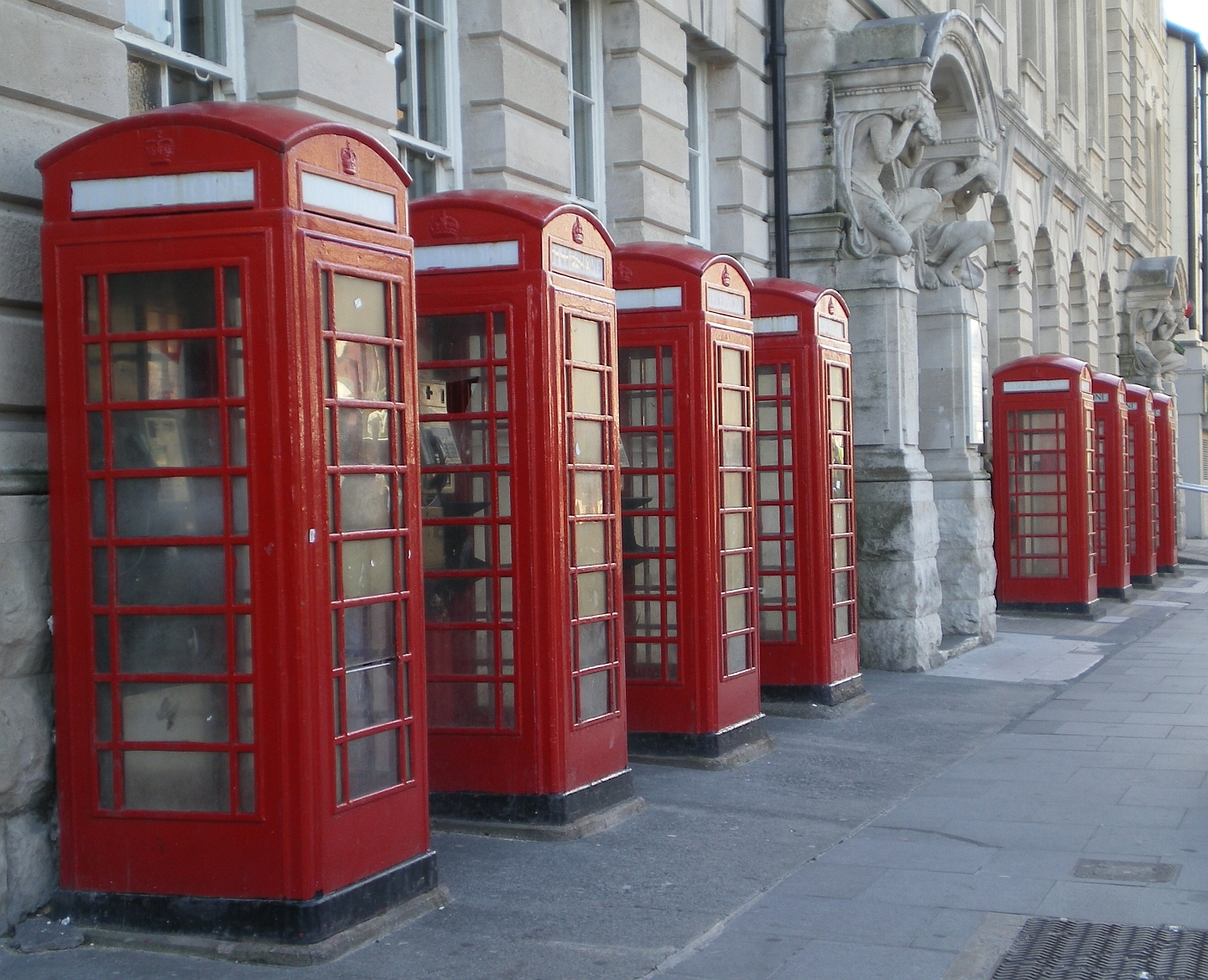
K6 telephone kiosks outside the former General Post Office, Blackpool, Lancashire

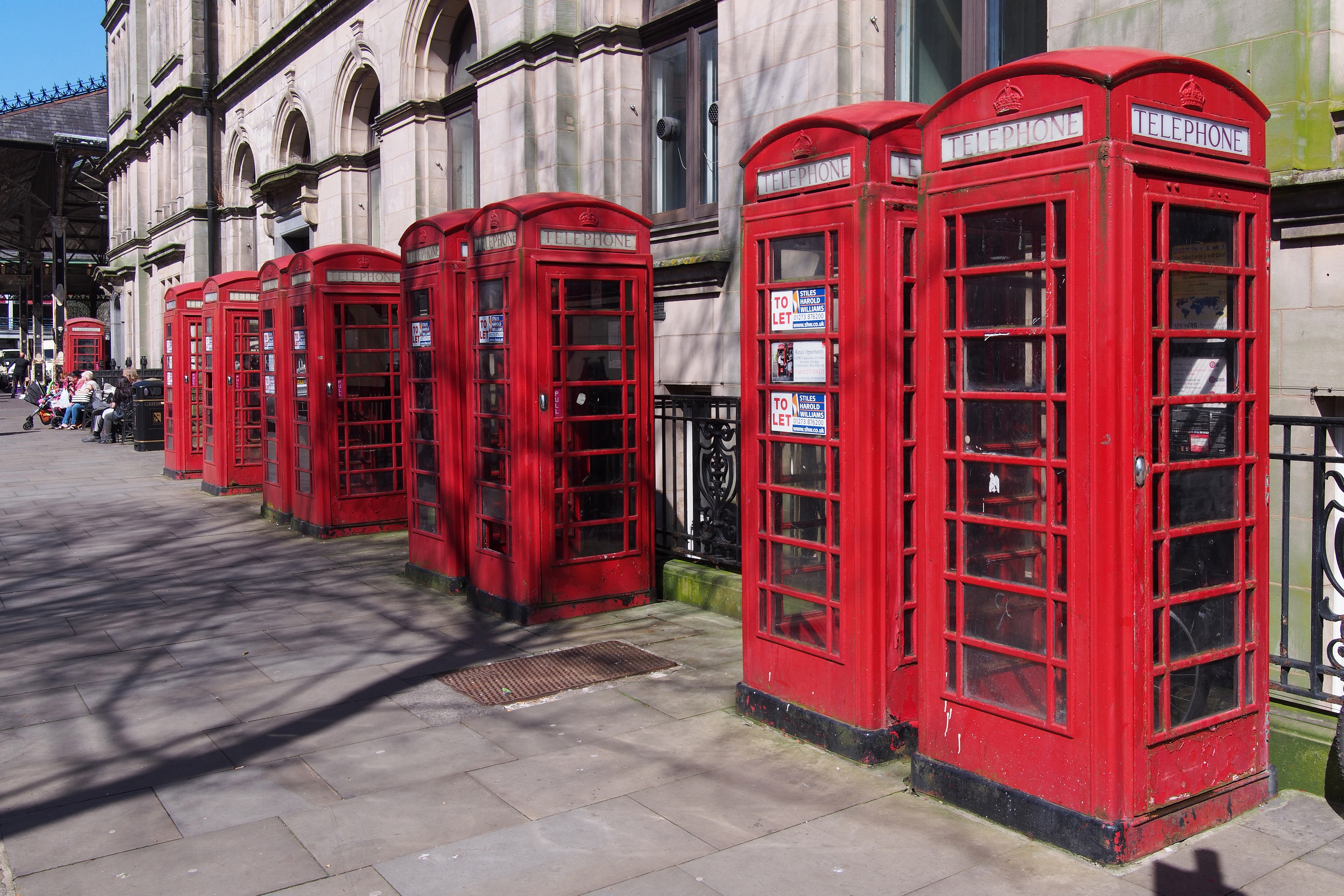
K6 telephone boxes in Preston, Lancashire

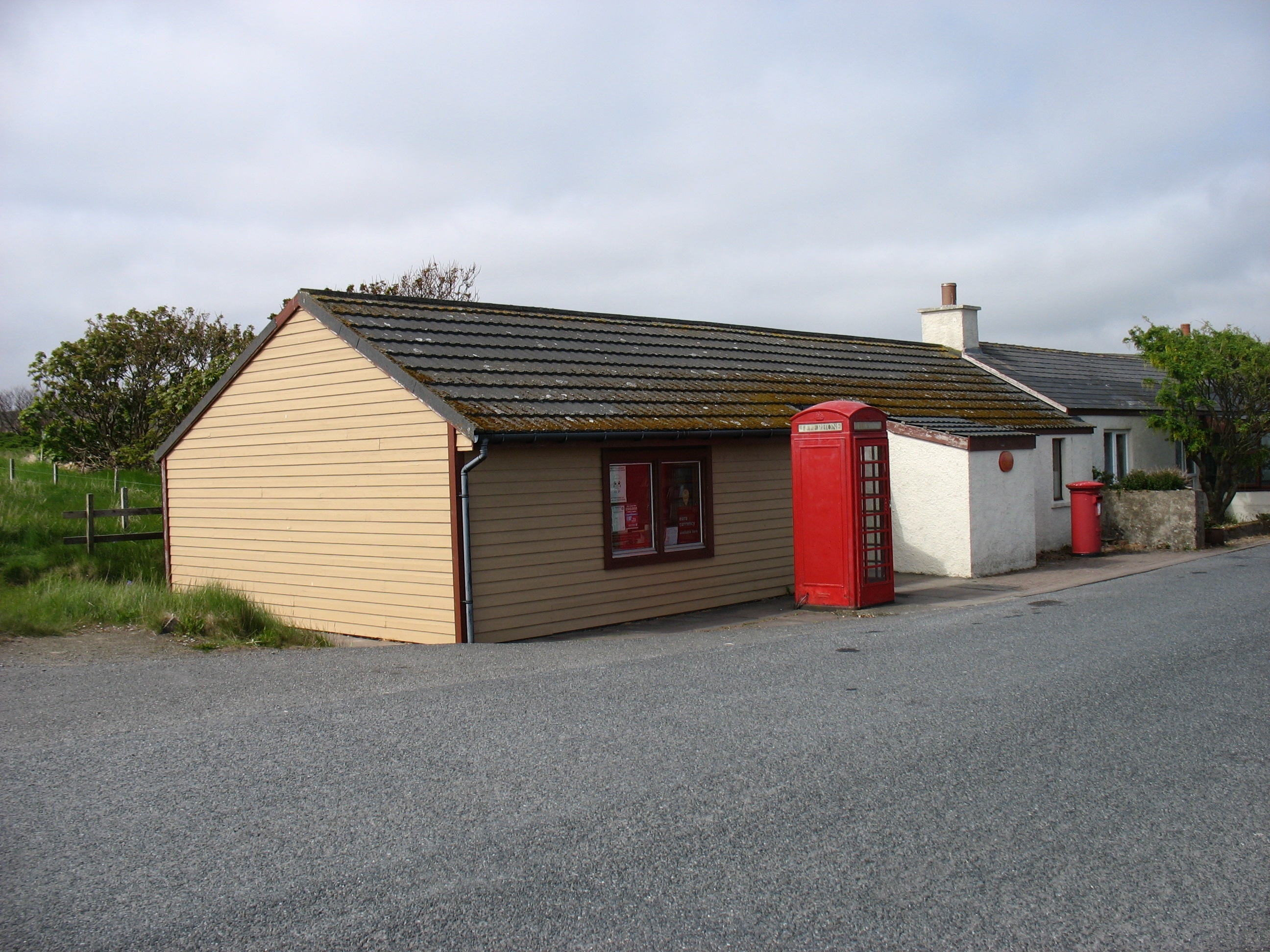
Shetland Islands

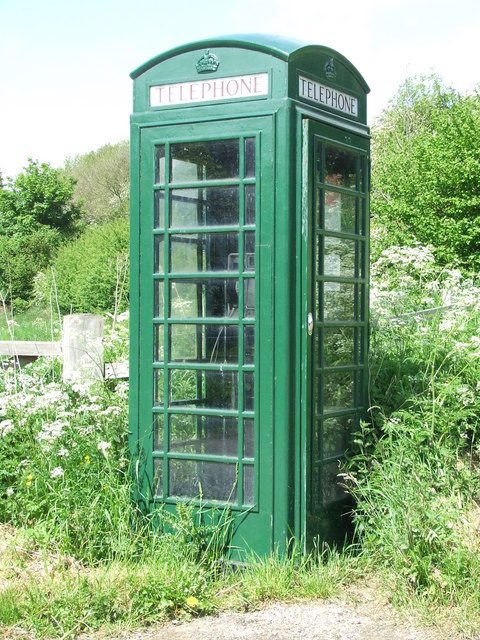
A green K6 box near Stokesley in North Yorkshire
Non-GPO/BT kiosks in the United Kingdom

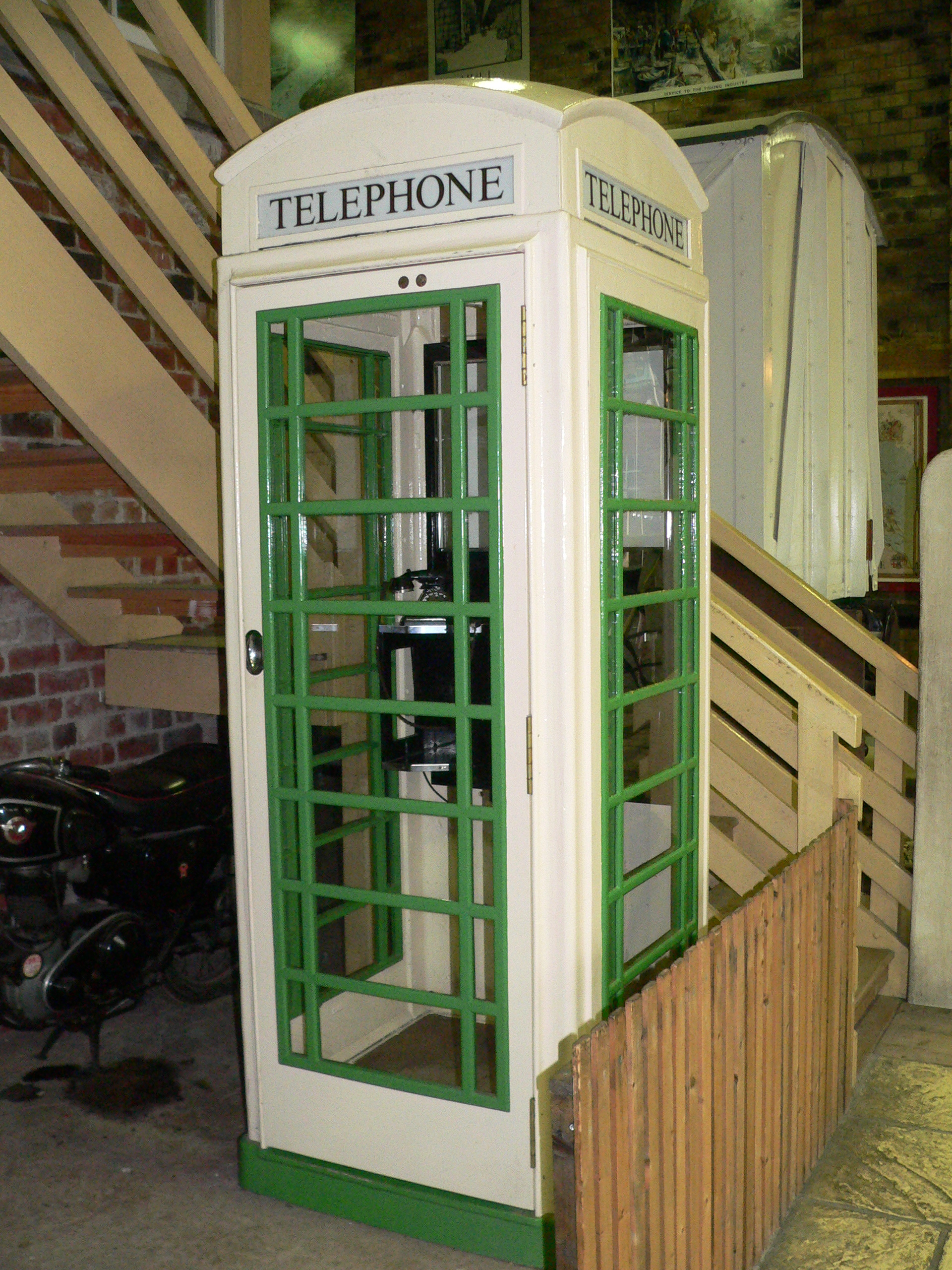
Preserved Kingston-upon-Hull crown-less K6 in original Hull Corporation livery in Hull Transport Museum

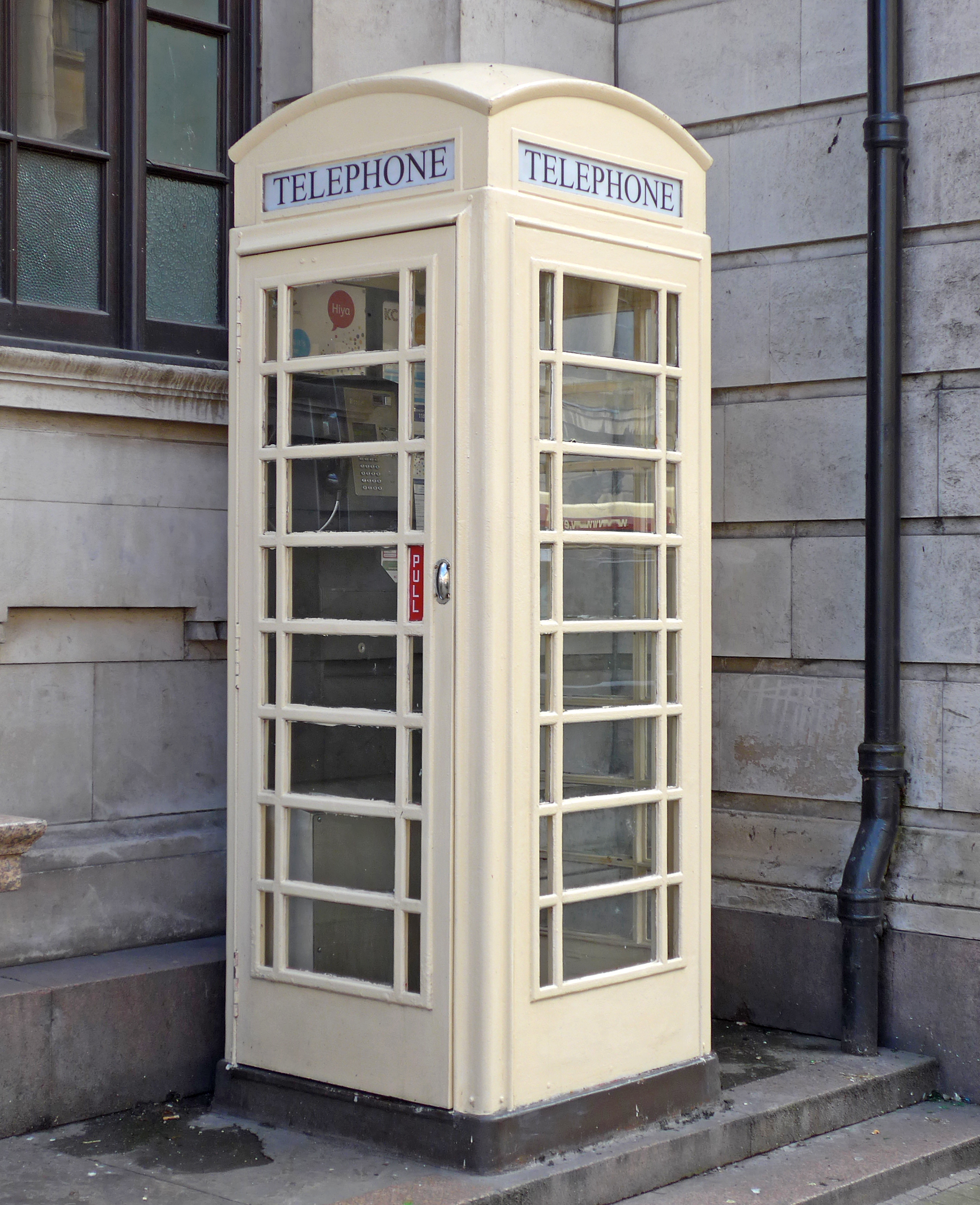
Kingston Communications K6 in Hull

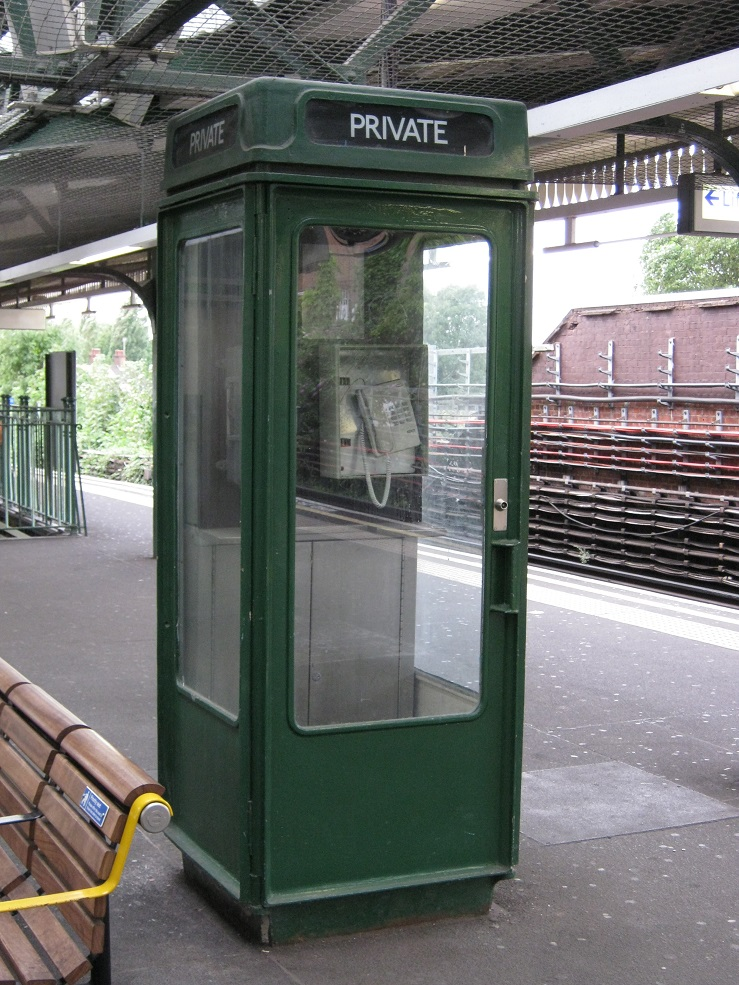
K8 housing an internal telephone at Golders Green tube station

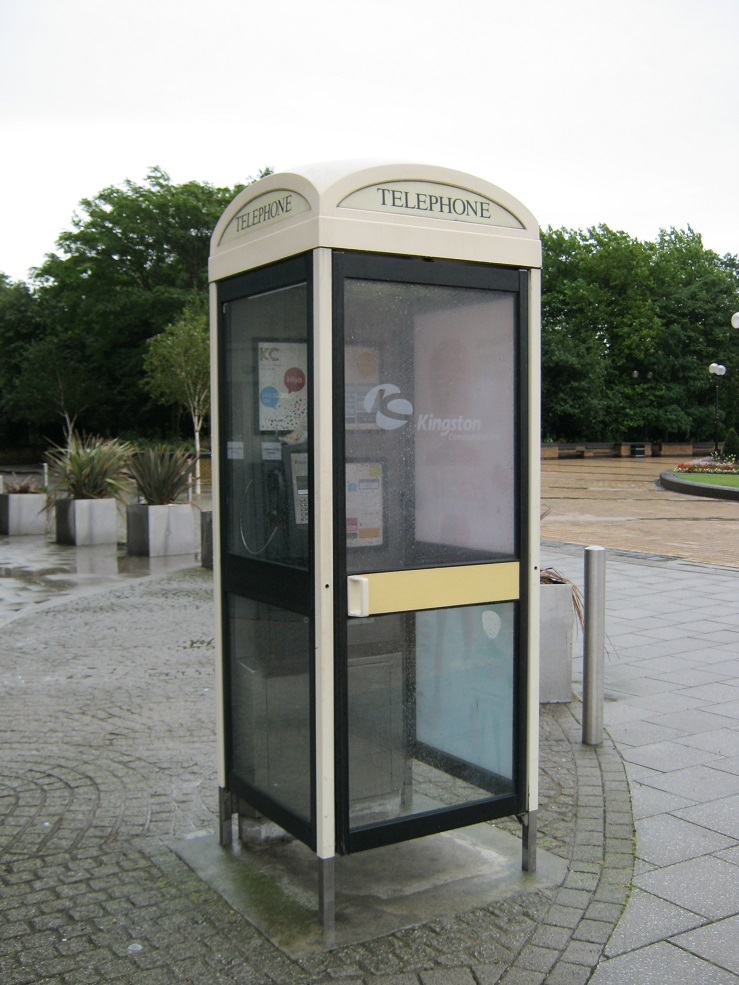
Kingston Communications KX100 PLUS in Hull

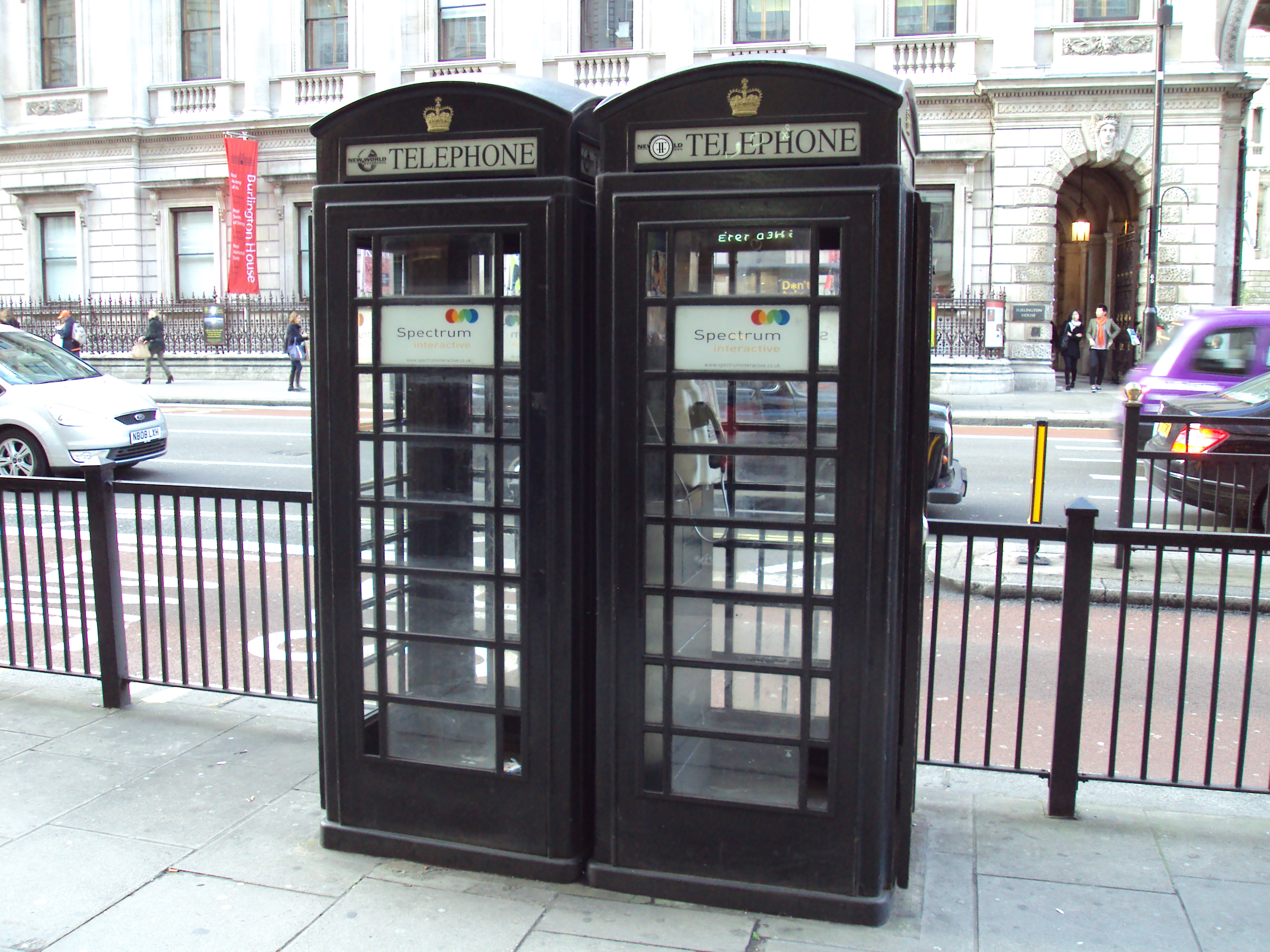
Two black K6 telephone boxes in Piccadilly in the City of Westminster, operated by New World Payphones Ltd

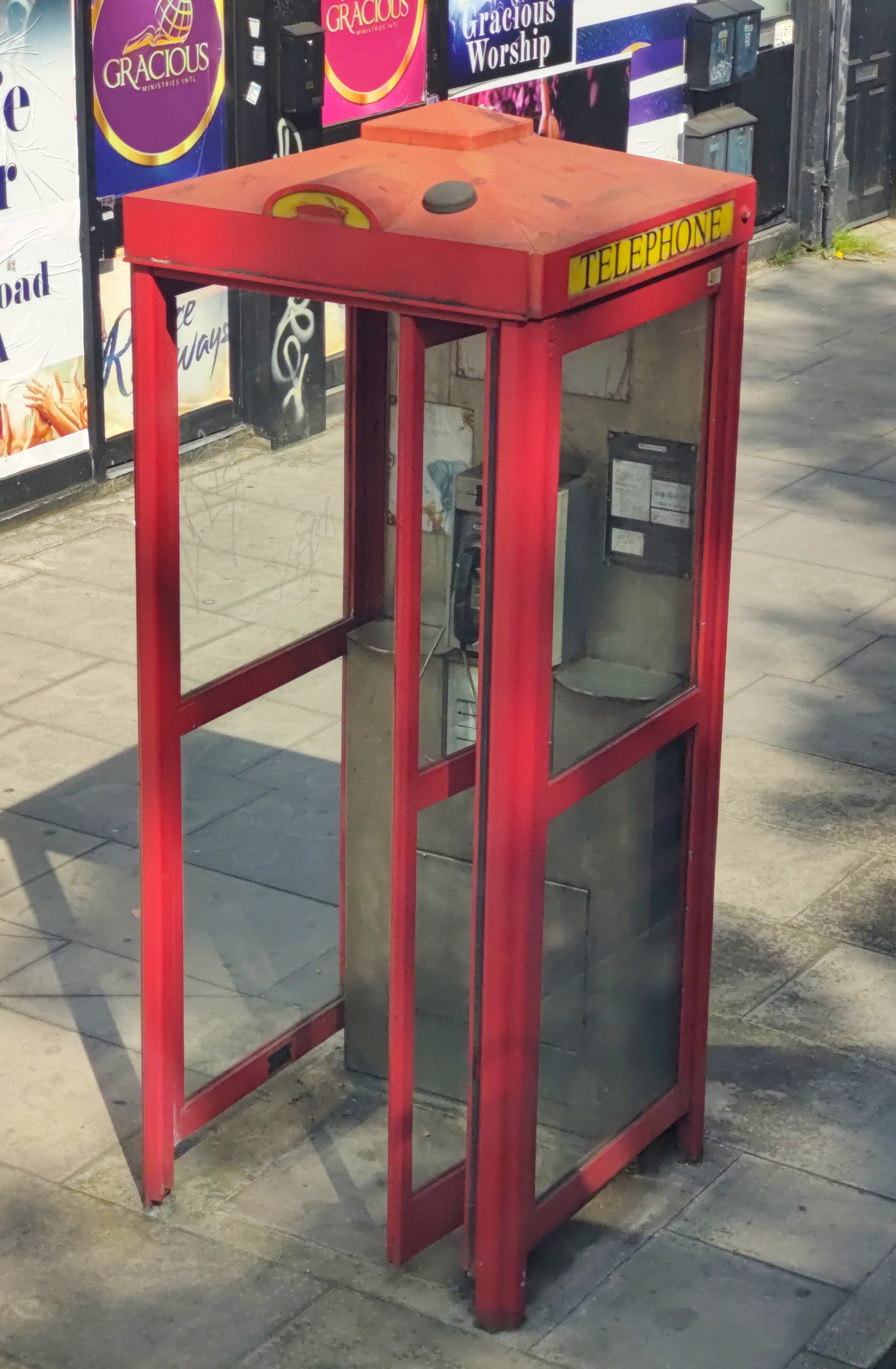
New World capped telephone booth in the London Borough of Lewisham
British telephone kiosks around the world

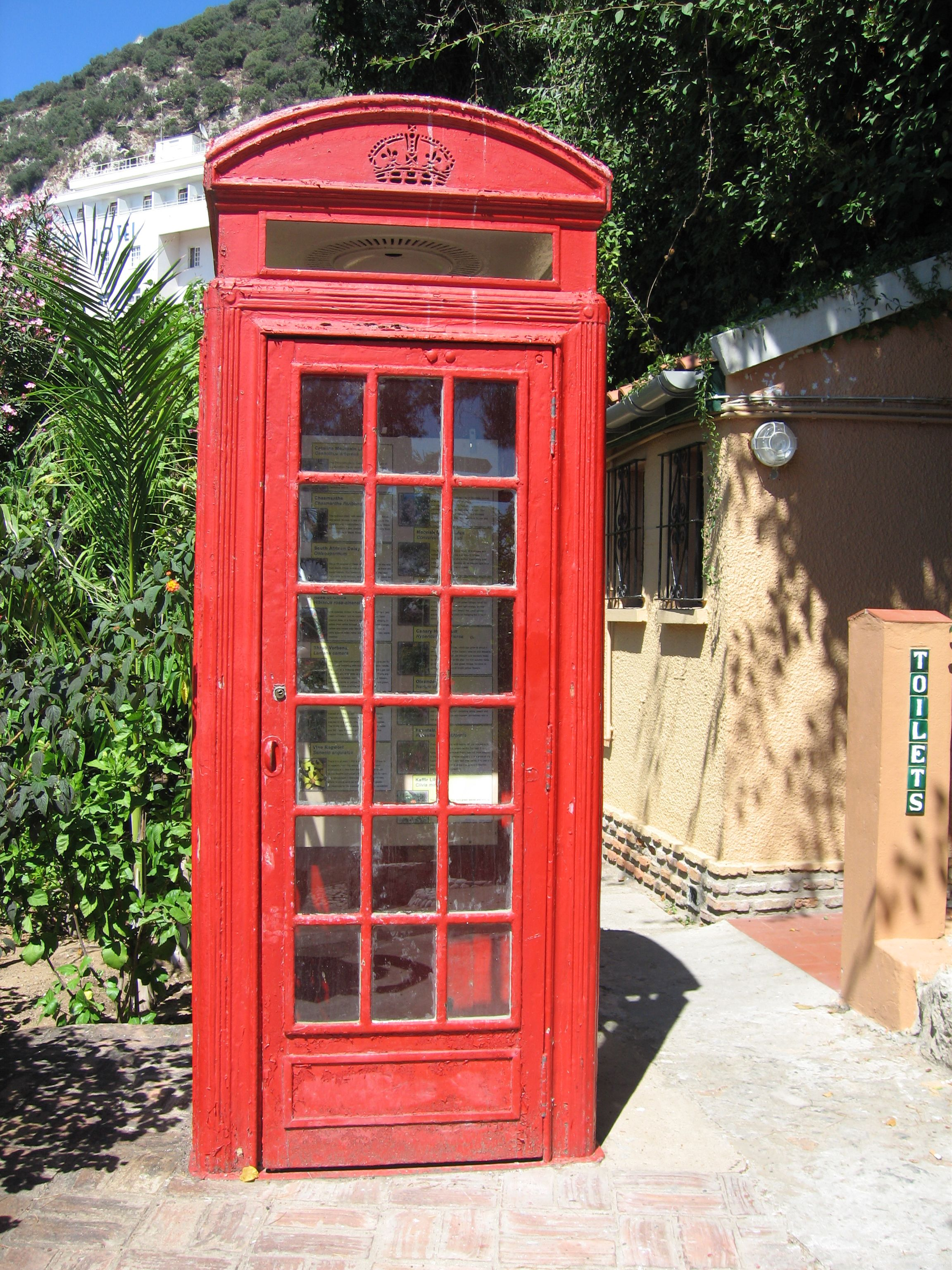
A K2 box at the Gibraltar Botanic Gardens

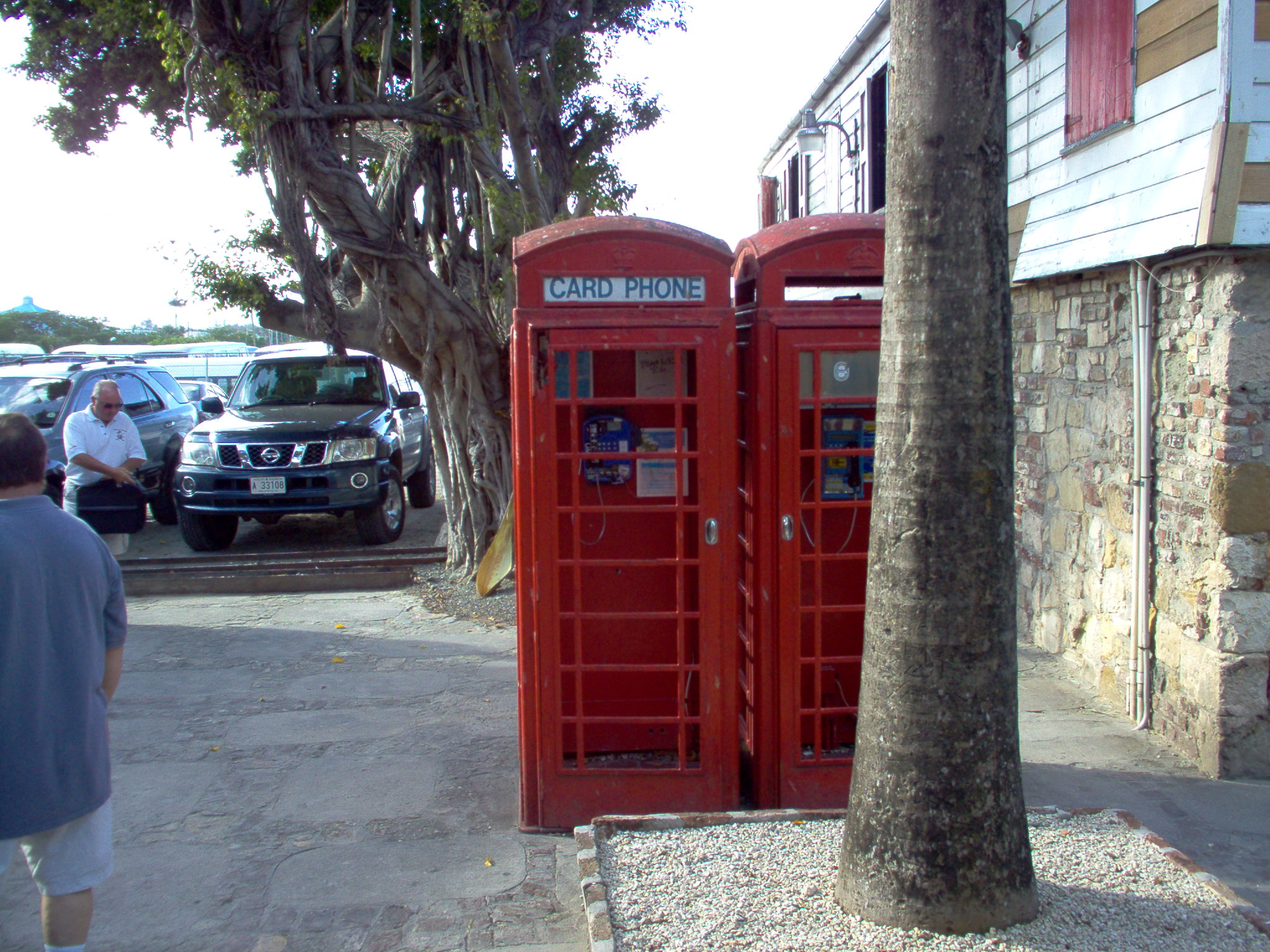
K6s in St. John's, Antigua

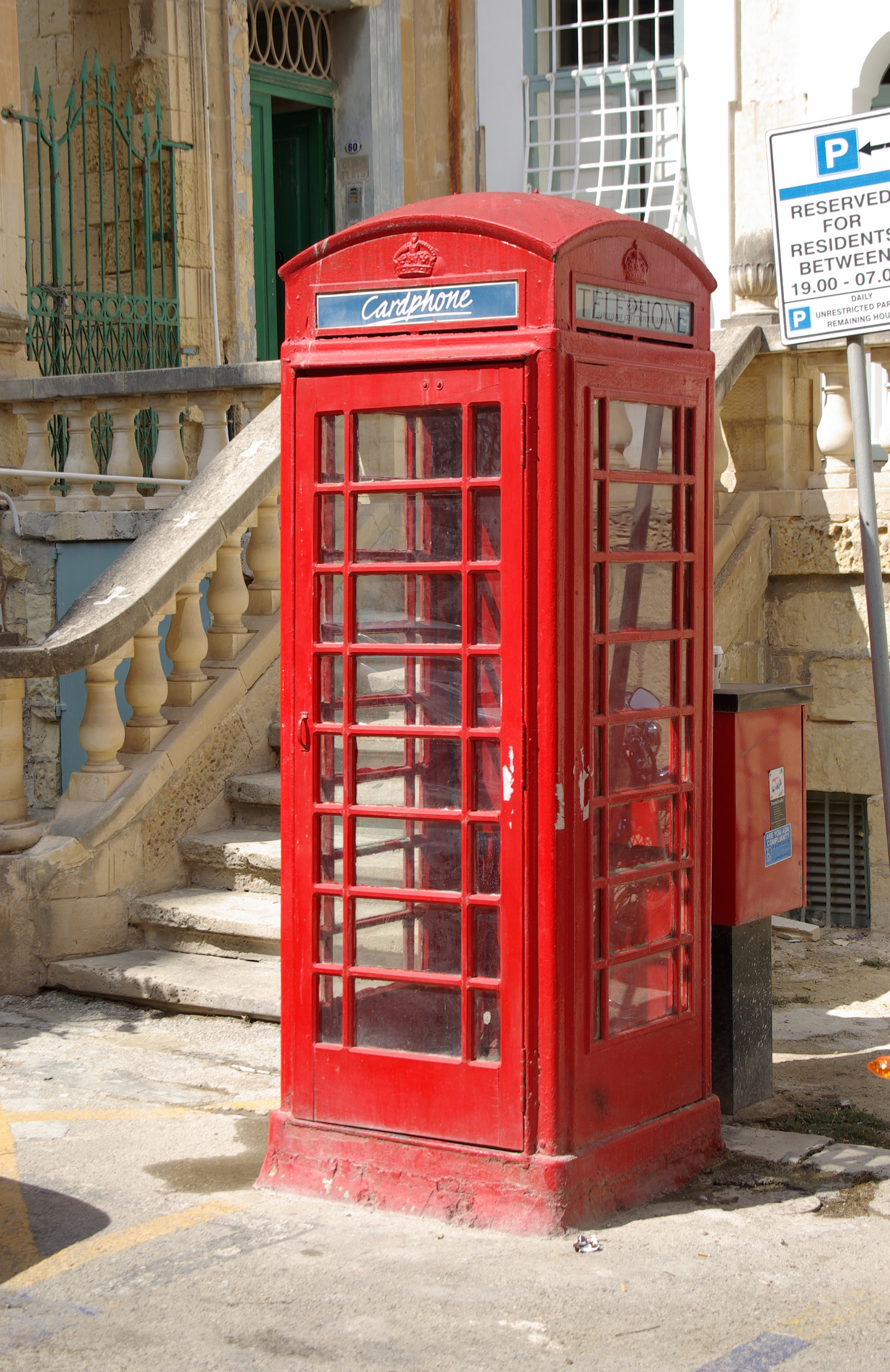
K6 in Valletta, Malta

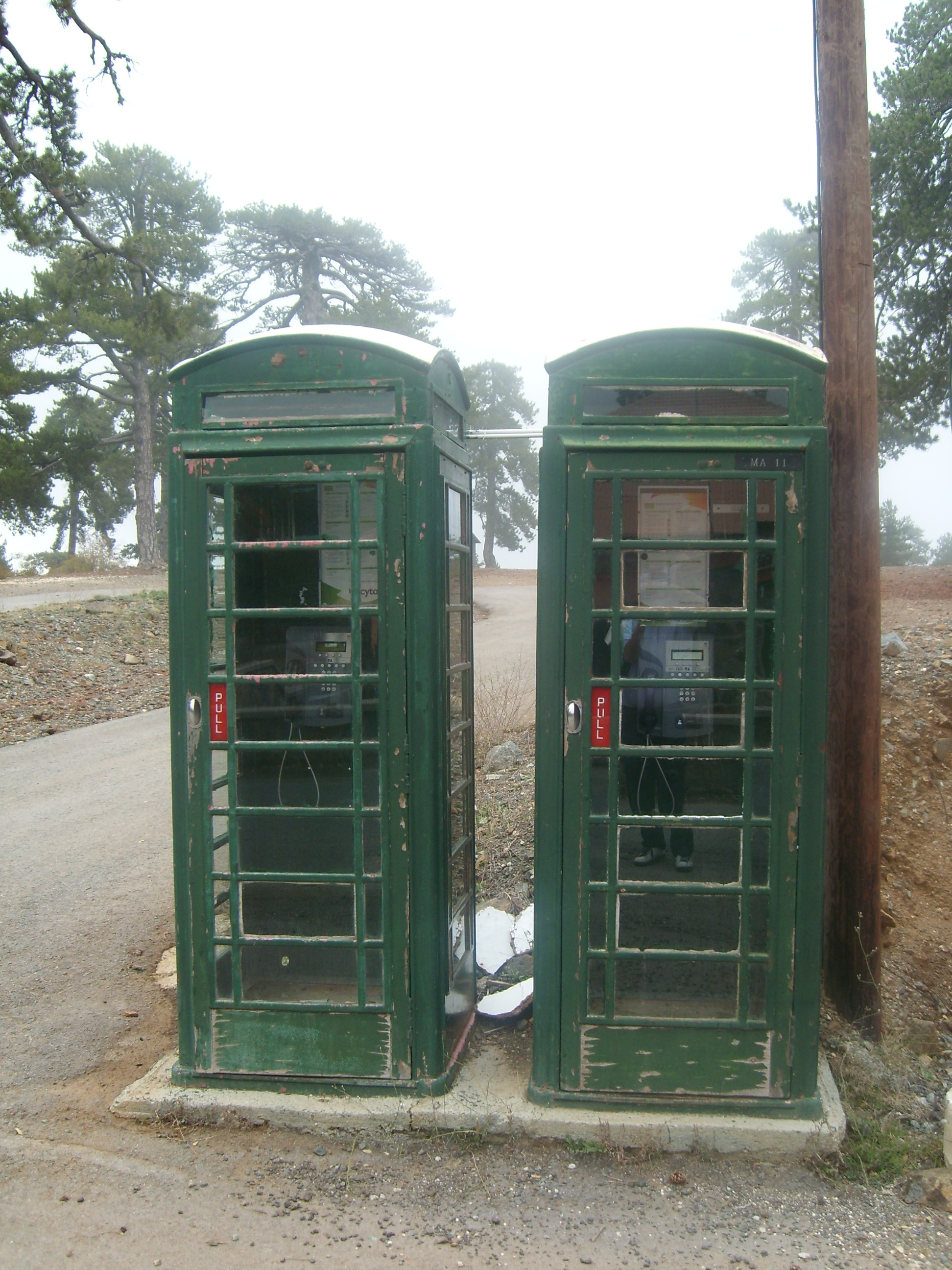
Crown-less K6s in the Troodos Mountains in Cyprus

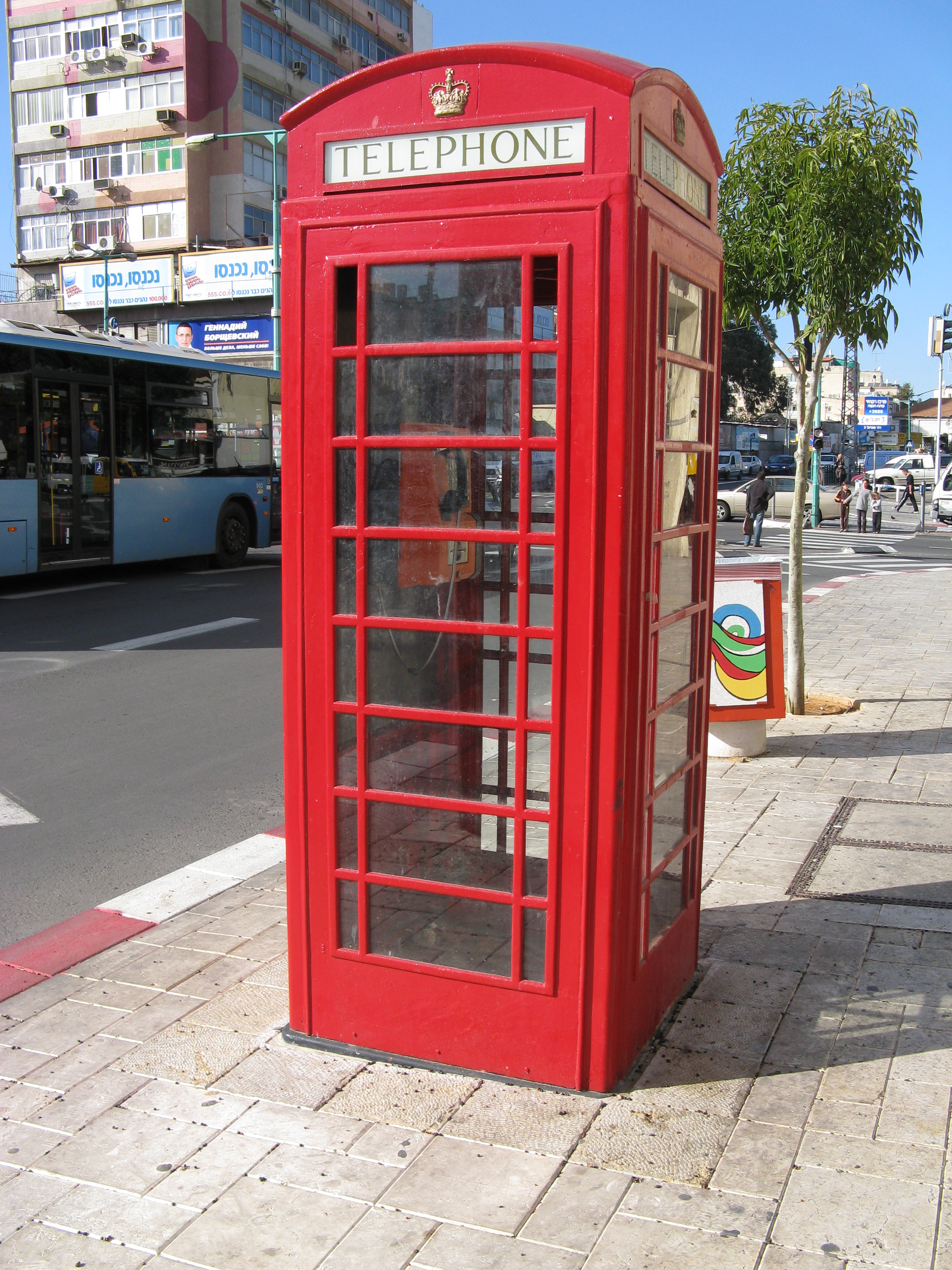
K6 in Petah Tikva, Israel

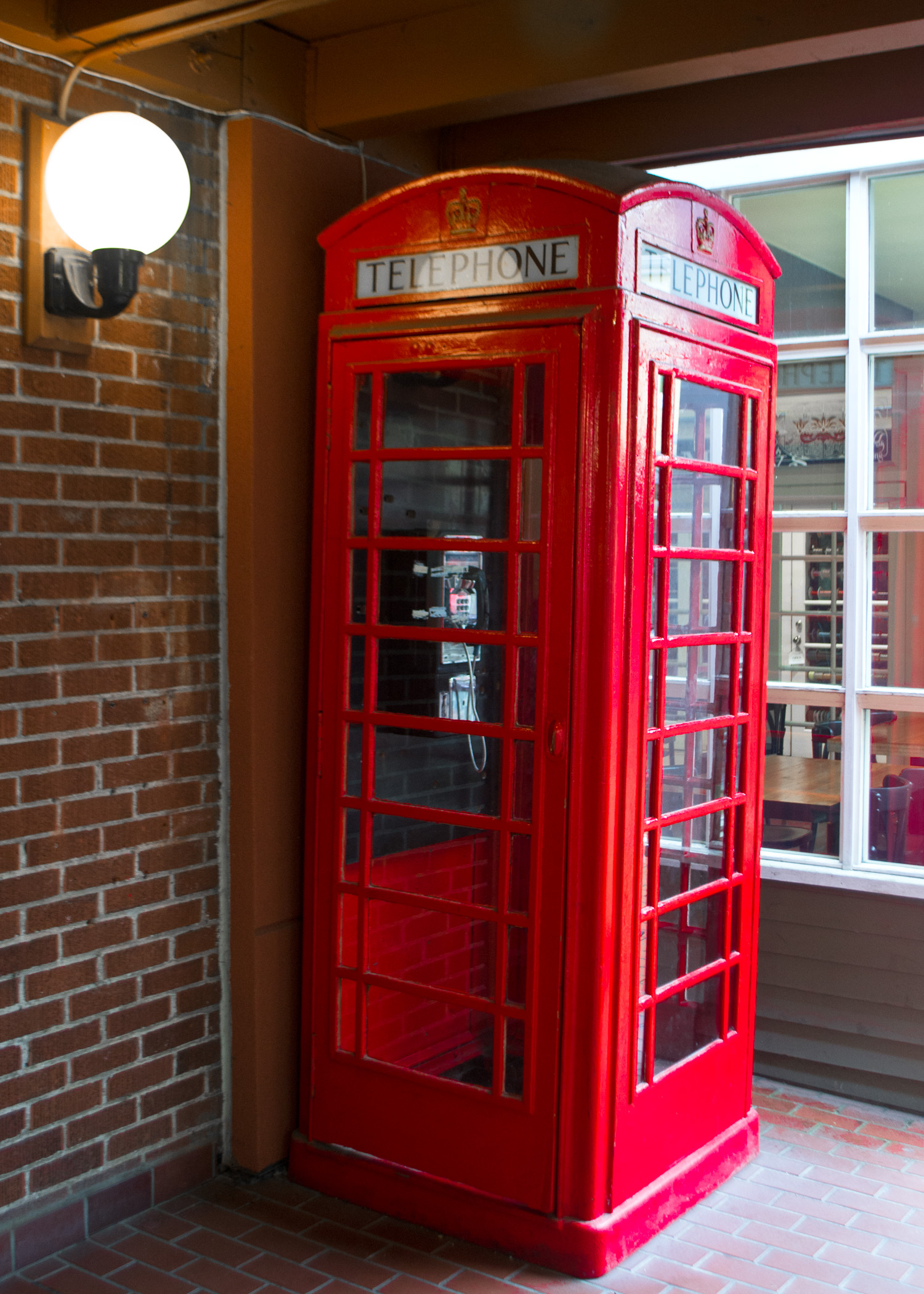
Queens crown K6 at Fifth Street Public Market in Eugene, Oregon

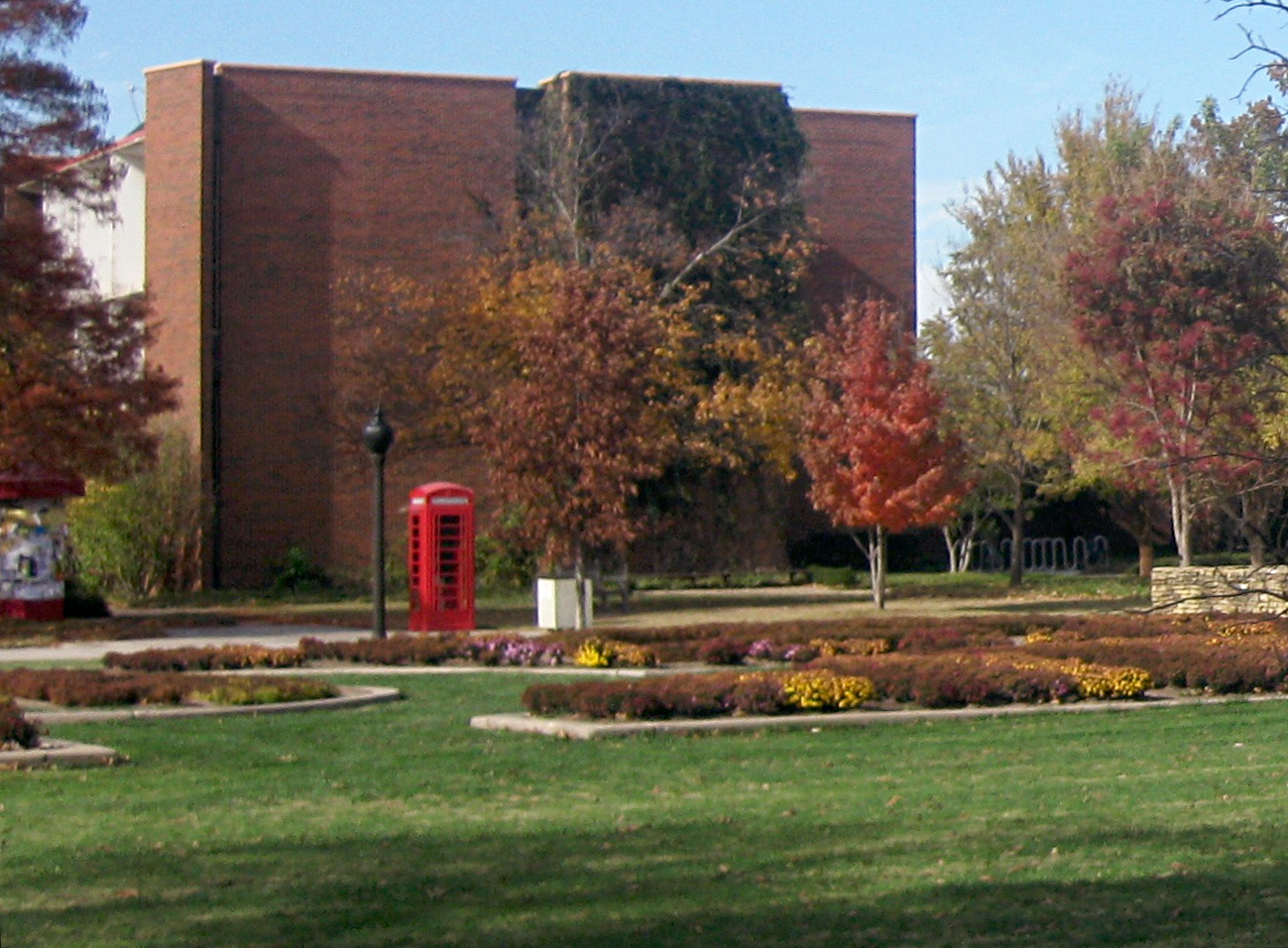
University of Oklahoma: red K6 in front of Copeland Hall

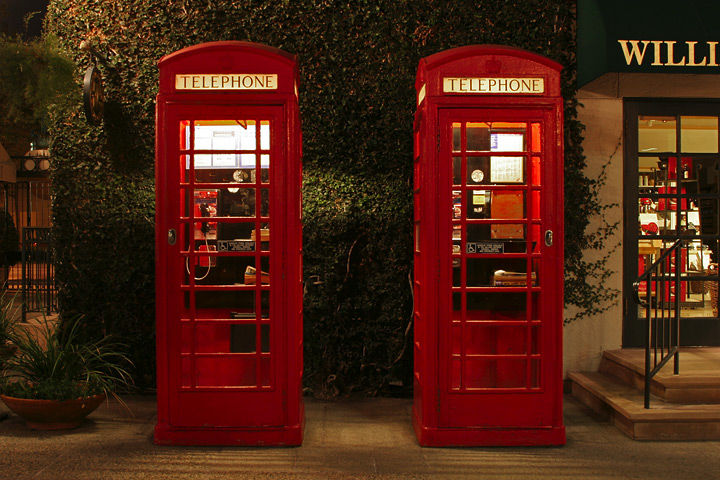
K6 kiosks in South Lake, Pasadena, California

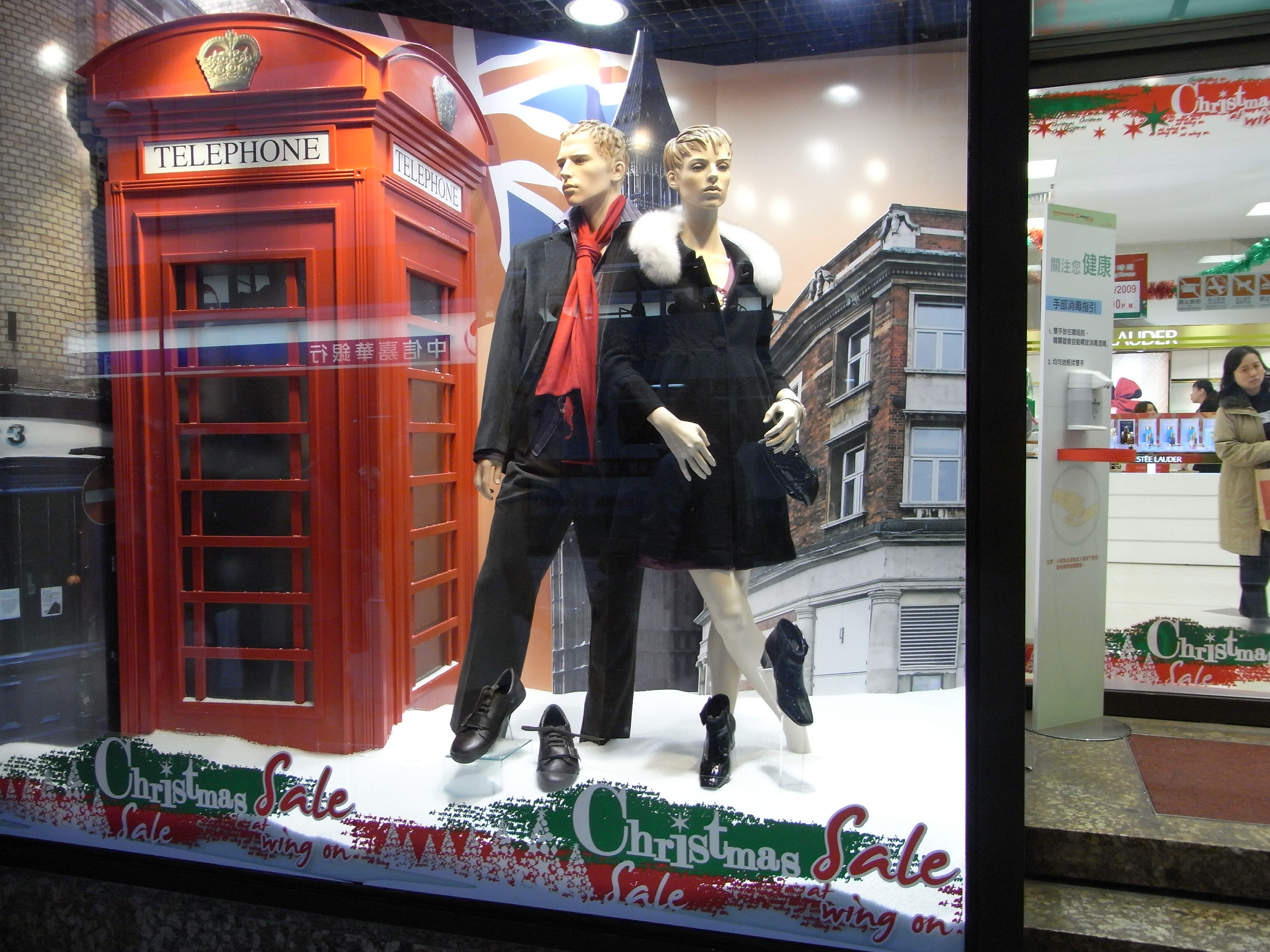
A replica of a K6 in a British-themed shop window in Hong Kong

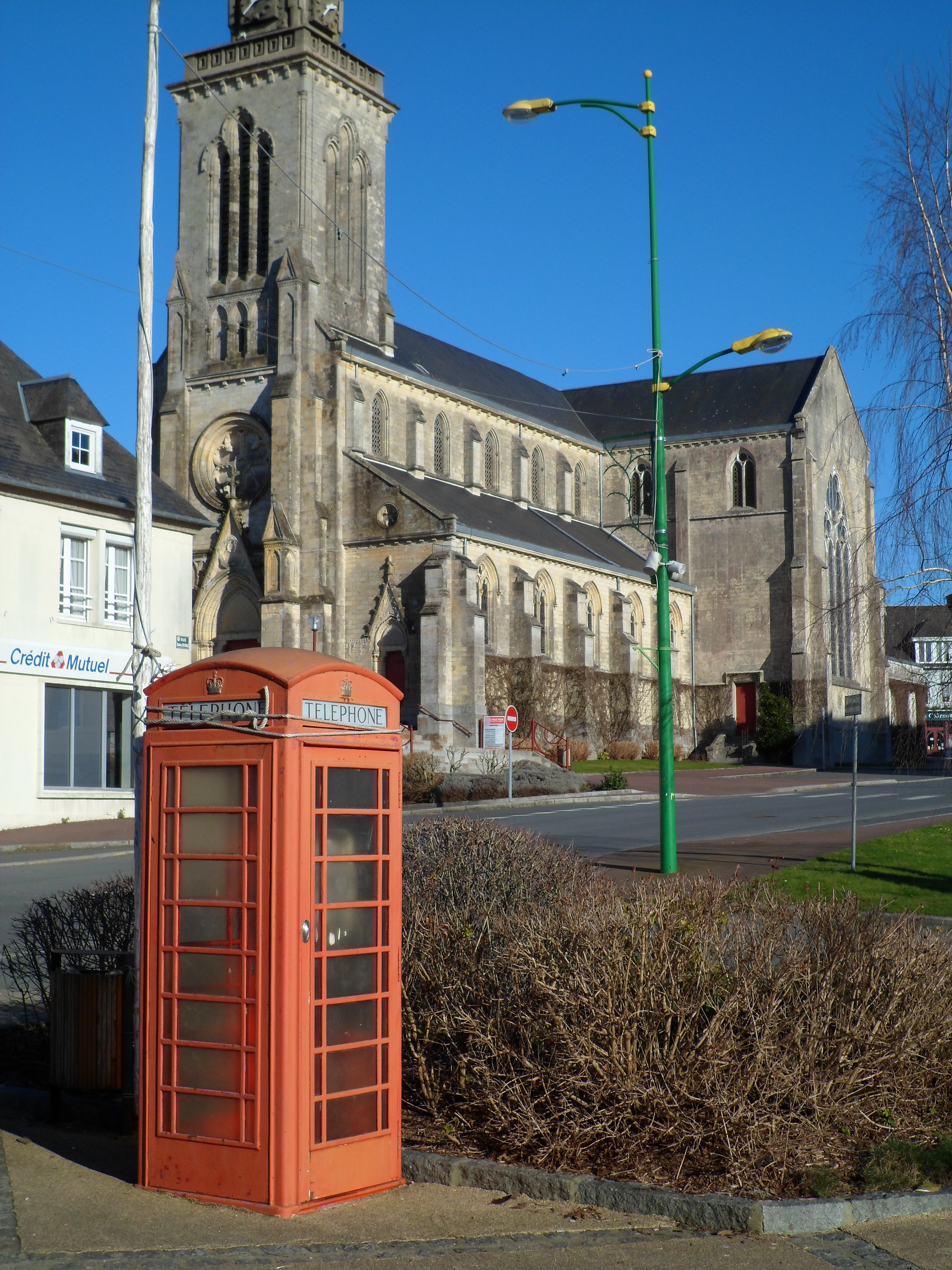
A K6 box at the Église Saint-Jean-Baptiste in Percy, Manche in Normandy, France

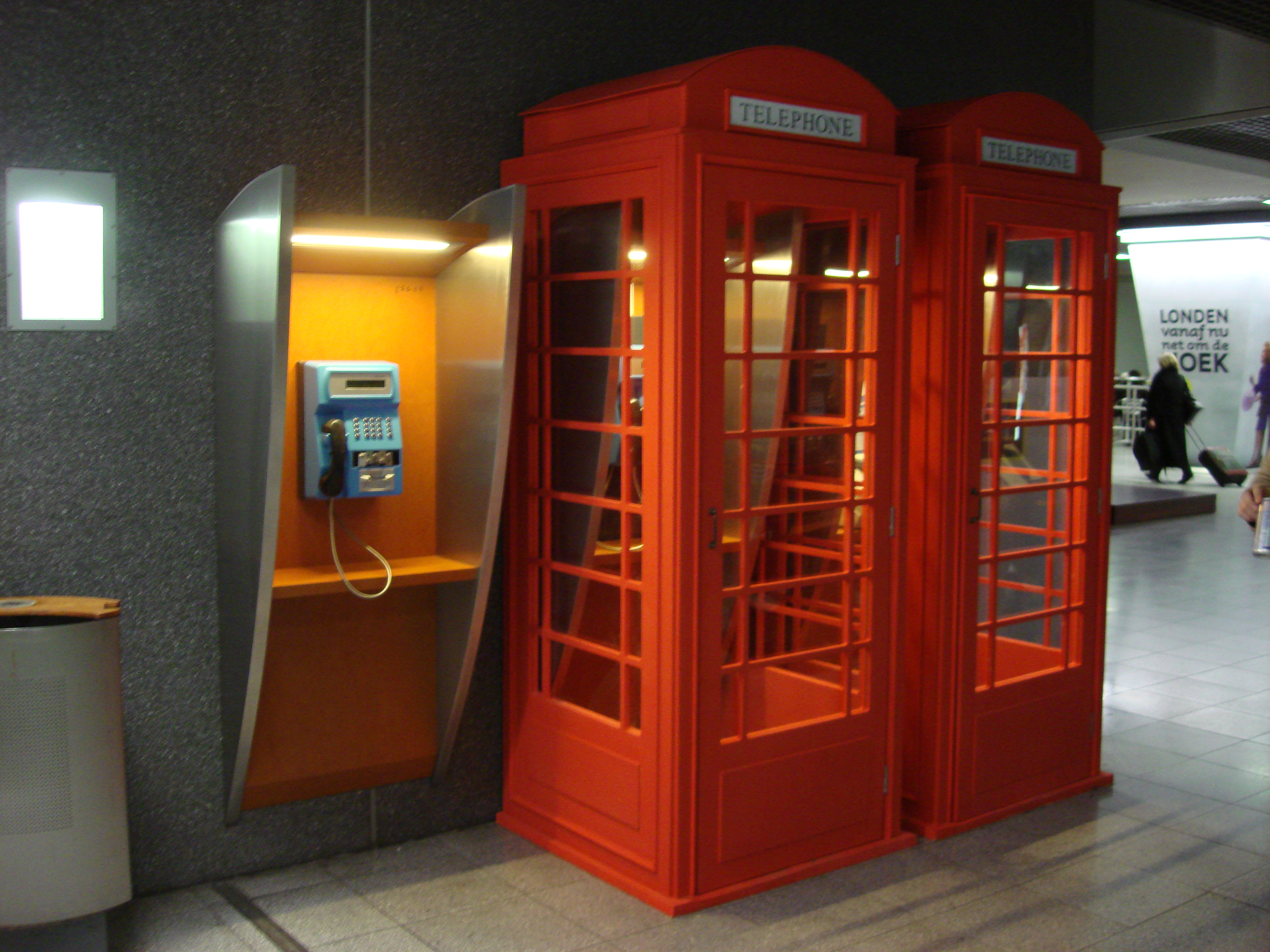
Two imitation British red telephone boxes at Brussels-South railway station

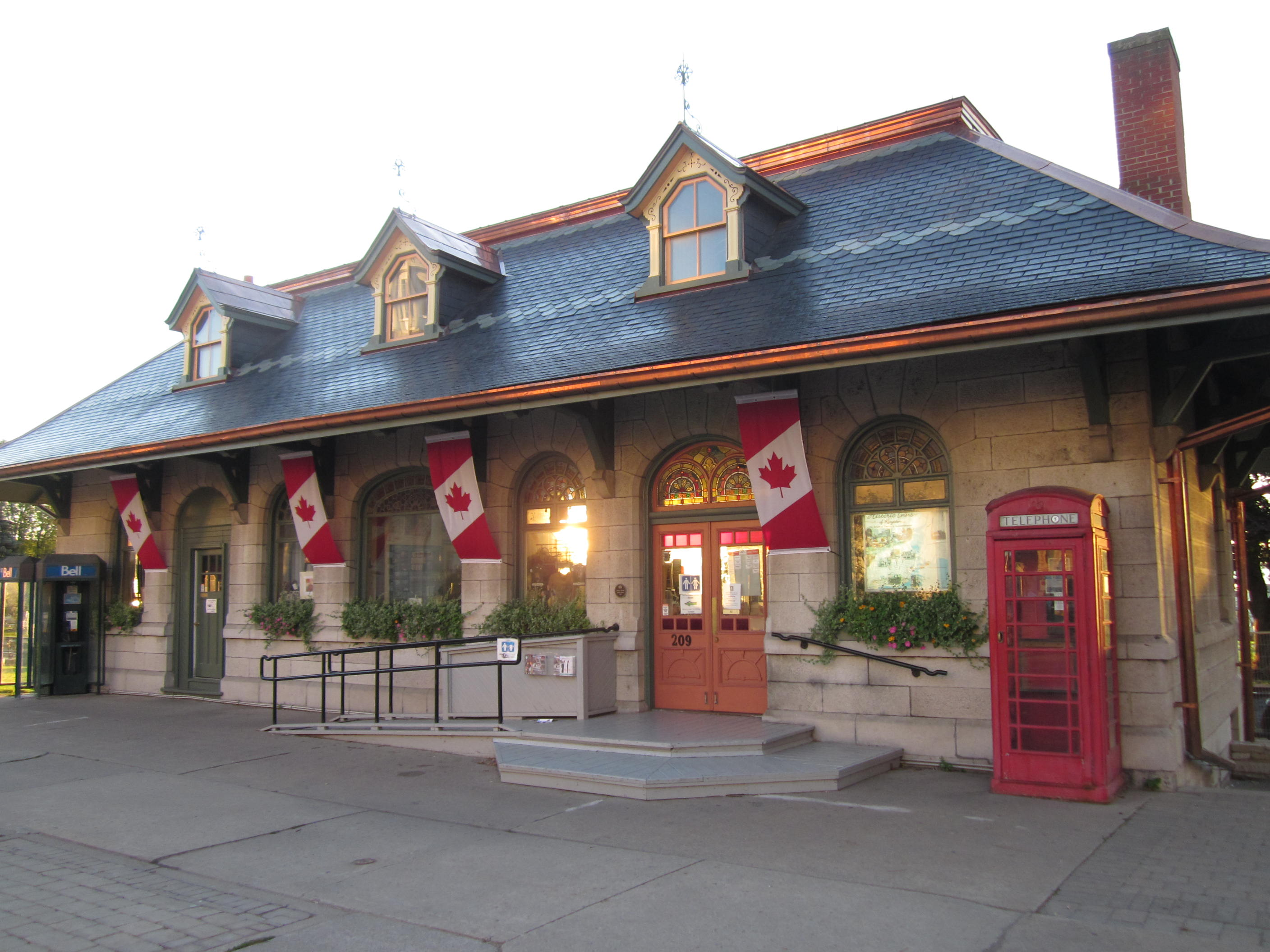
British red phone box alongside standard Bell Canada boxes at former Kingston and Pembroke Railway station

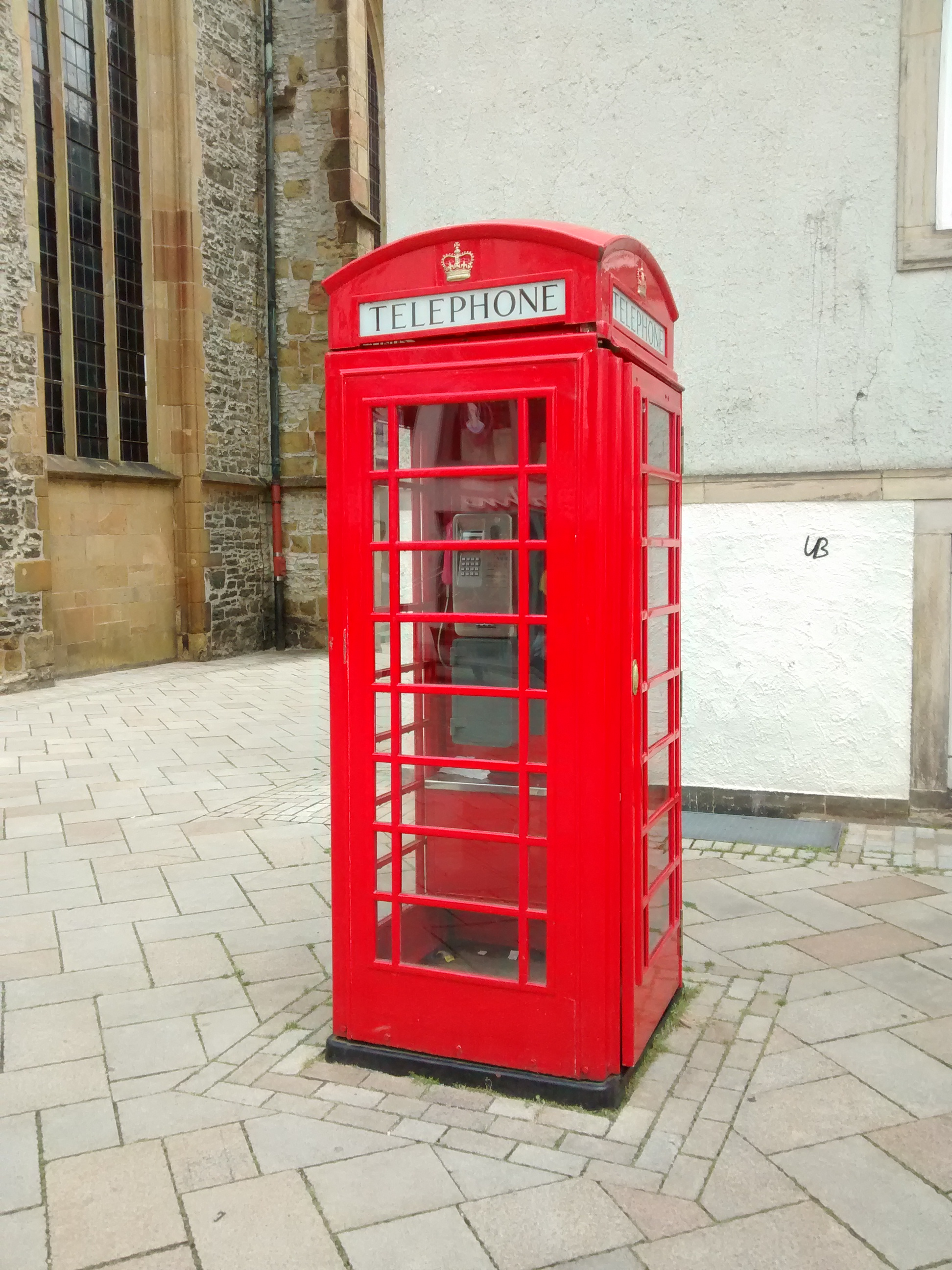
Telephone box standing in Bielefeld, Germany

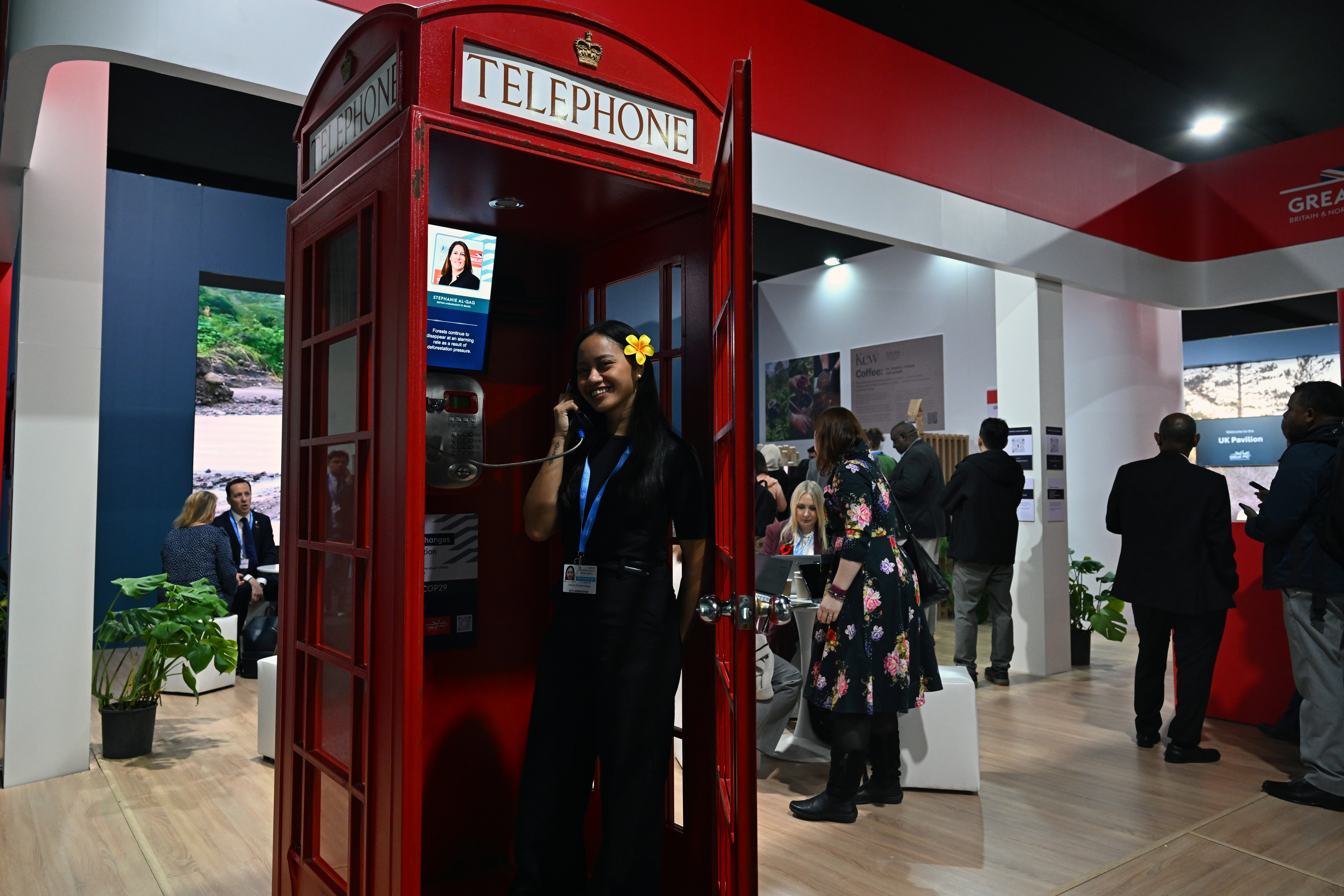
A K6 at the 2024 United Nations Climate Change Conference in Azerbaijan
Non GPO/BT Red telephone kiosks around the world

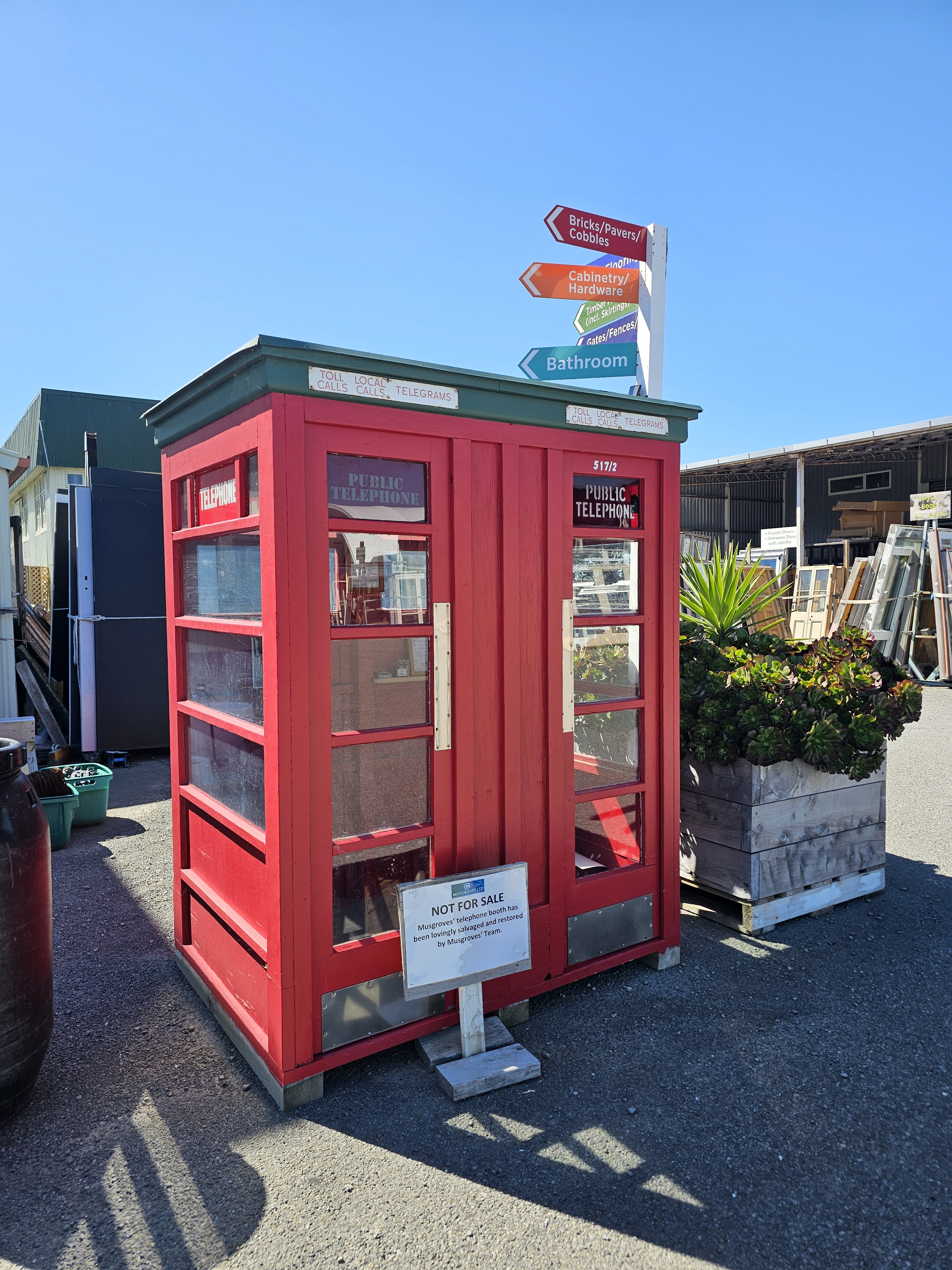
New Zealand Twin Red Phone Box at Musgroves in Christchurch

== See also ==
- Pillar box (red UK postal box)
- Police box (blue UK police phone box)
- AEC Routemaster (red London bus)
- KX telephone boxes

== Bibliography ==
- Johannessen, Neil, ed. (1991). Ring up Britain: the early years of the telephone in the United Kingdom. London: British Telecom. ISBN 0-948257-88-1.
- Johannessen, Neil (1999). Telephone Boxes (2nd ed.). Princes Risborough: Shire. ISBN 0-7478-0419-2.
- Linge, Nigel; Johannessen, Neil; Hurley, Andrew; Simmons, Andy; Sutton, Andy (2024). "Sir Giles Gilbert Scott's K2 telephone kiosk – a design classic". Industrial Archaeology Review. 46 (2): 87–98.
- Stamp, Gavin (1989). Telephone Boxes. London: Chatto & Windus. ISBN 0-7011-3366-X.
