= Mojave phone booth (disambiguation) =

The Mojave phone booth was a lone telephone booth in what is now the Mojave National Preserve in California.

Mojave phone booth may also refer to:

- Mojave Phone Booth (film), a 2006 film about the phone booth directed by John Putch
