= KX telephone boxes =

Public telephones in the UK

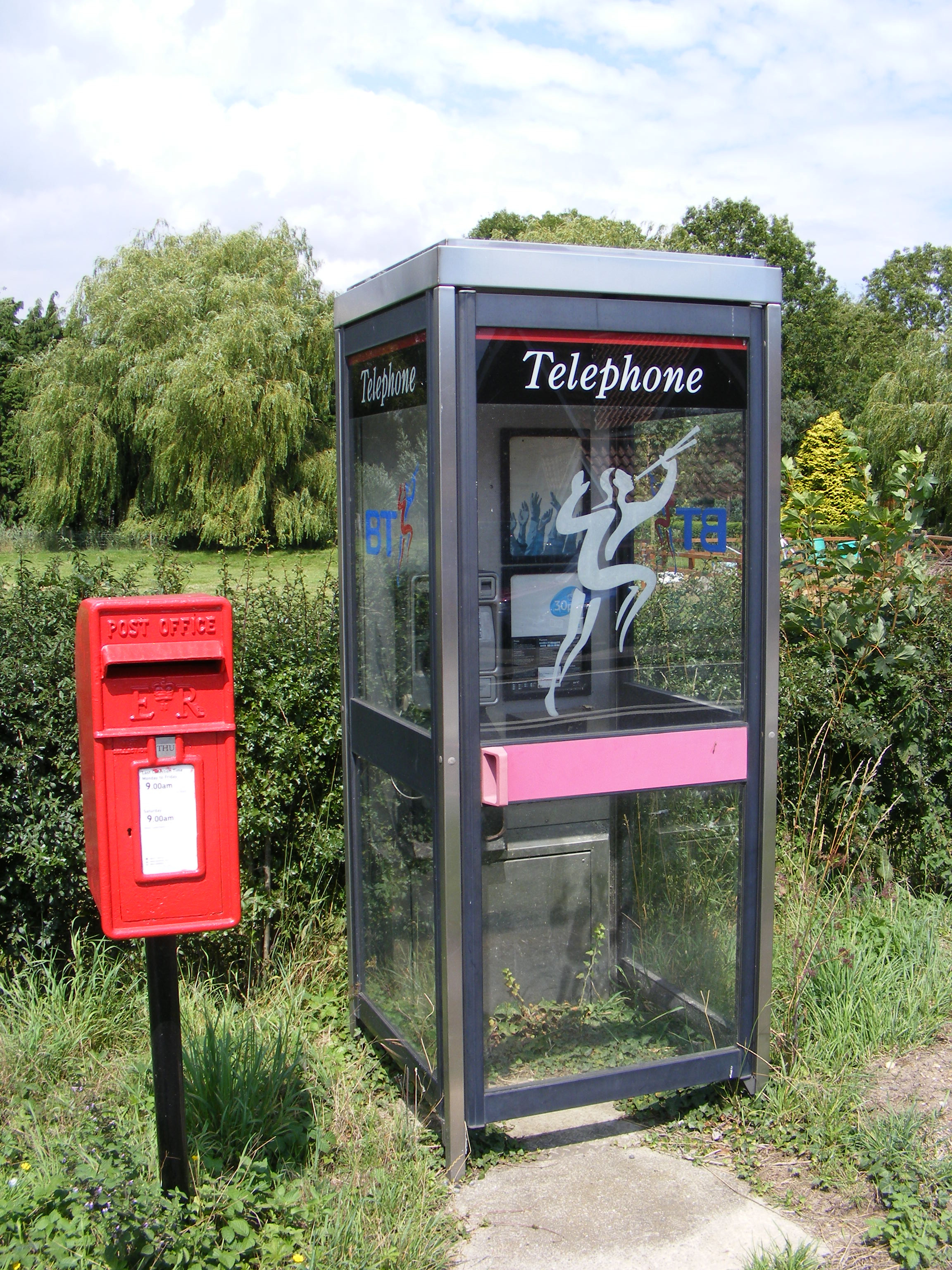
KX100 telephone box with 1991 branding

The KX series of telephone boxes in the United Kingdom was introduced by BT (British Telecom) in 1985. Following the privatisation of BT in 1984, the company decided to create a newly designed and improved take on the British telephone box, which at this point consisted of predominantly red telephone boxes which BT had recently acquired, the most common being the iconic K6 box. These red boxes were considered flawed in parts by BT for several reasons, including cost, lack of ventilation, accessibility and maintenance. After a series of trials and an earlier aborted project, BT announced they were to spend £160m on a series of new phoneboxes, new computer chip controlled payphones and the phasing out of all older red telephone boxes. The KX Kiosk range was designed for BT by Warwick based DCA Design International (at the time 'David Carter Associates'), and engineered by GKN in Telford.

The main model of the KX range is the square upright rectangular KX100 kiosk with or without a door. Upon launch, there were two further production models - the open pedestal 'KX200' and the triangular 'KX300'. The housings were initially produced at a rate of 5,000-6,000 a year between 1985-1986, with production intensifying to around 3,000 a month between 1987-1989 before slowing down in the early-to-mid-1990s once the older kiosk estate was replaced and the number of public payphones had more than doubled. In 1987, the smaller 'vandal resistant' KX410 and KX420 pillars joined the range (but both were built by smaller companies than GKN with low production numbers). In 1990, the indoor KX500 pillar/wall range was designed, having several sub-variants, and production of the KX200 and KX300 dropped off. In 1996, the KX100 was adapted into a 'new' upgraded model called the KX+.

At the peak of BT's public telephone network's popularity in 1999 the company operated around 140,000 payphones. The figure includes phones housed in the red heritage models from the GPO and Post Office era, within/on the KX range (including thousands of the pillar and wall mounted KX500 series which could host between 1-4 payphones on one unit). Exact numbers of KX housings produced are not known but research is underway and likely to be announced in a forthcoming book about the KX housings in late 2026. New production of KX kiosks and housings largely ceased in 2001, with BT contracting GKN to refurbish recovered models for re-use. From 2002, BT began a programme of identifying and removing thousands of underused payphones and the redundant housings. By 2024, BT's own figures placed the remaining payphone estate at just 15,000 and the company intends to reduce the number to somewhere between 2,500 and 5,000 kiosks with working payphones by 2027.

Whilst the updated functionality of the KX housings were praised, the designs were criticised by the Design and Architecture establishment as utilitarian; functionality over form; and stylistically inferior to the red telephone boxes. Critics missed the point that in order to make the payphone service profitable and more robust against the constant idle and criminal vandalism BT had asked specifically for housing that cost less to maintain; did not require repainting every two-years; could be accessed by disabled users, children and the elderly (the old GPO kiosks had very heavy doors), and did away with the need for 72 panes of glass, having between 0, 3, and 6 depending on KX model. The plan to replace the red boxes was heavily criticised from a heritage perspective, and this led to a successful public campaign by the c20th Society (at the time called 'The Thirties Society' to save many of the red kiosks. The c20th Society later ran campaigns to secure the listing of the K8 models in the late 2000's and in 2024, campaigned for the listing of a handful of KX models for their important contribution to public telecommunications - and indeed, because the arrival of the KX models caused the initial campaign to list the older red GPO kiosks.

Most of the main KX series had their branding livery revamped after BT changed their corporate logo in 1991. Occasionally old branding resurface on elevations hidden for decades when one of a pair of kiosks is removed. Production of the KX100/200/300 range stopped in 1996 when the KX+ was launched, attempting to address the criticisms that the original KX100 had received by lowering the door handle, brightening the interior and enlarging the upper windows. The biggest revision was the addition of a red roof dome - reminiscent of older phone boxes. Later versions of the KX+ incorporated broadband connection and blue domes. BT was reported to have stopped making enclosed telephone boxes altogether in 2001. From 2007 BT Payphones continued to be installed in modified KX100/KX+ that had been converted to ATM cash-dispensers. From 2007 BT started to introduce the semi-open JCDecaux advert pillar called the ST6 (Street Talk 6). Later advertising pillars followed, with side mounted keypad public phones, then digital touchscreens.

== Background ==
In 1980, preparing for privatisation, Post Office Telephones, who owned all of the United Kingdom's telephone boxes, except those in Hull, was renamed British Telecom, later to become simply BT. The most common telephone box in the United Kingdom was the K6 red telephone box, introduced in 1935. The newly formed BT inherited a 1979 project to design new kiosks for the 1980s, but costs were escalating and it would come to nothing. There were many local kiosk ideas trialed on a regional basis by regional telephone boards of first Post Office Telecomm's, then BT. Other projects in included the introduction of phonecard-operated telephone kiosks in July 1981 after a successful trial, with the phones in the kiosks being named Cardphones. Another project, this time localised in the BT NorthWest Region over winter 1980/81, was a trial painting of about 80 red telephone boxes (mostly K6 but some K8's) in yellow, as a test of BT's 'new' corporate colour. It was only ever a trial, but the National press misquoted a BT press release and erroneously told the public every red phonebox (77,000 of them) would become yellow. This was harshly received by the public, with the Daily Mail launching a campaign "against the yellow peril" and questions were asked in Parliament. In the House of Lords, the Earl of Gowrie, the Minister of State for Employment, called on BT "to abandon this ridiculous scheme". In the House of Commons, Mark Lennox-Boyd MP asked the then Prime Minister, Margaret Thatcher, if she would treat the decision "with the greatest possible dismay". Thatcher, who herself was responsible for the privatisation, would only say that she could "see my honourable Friend's point".

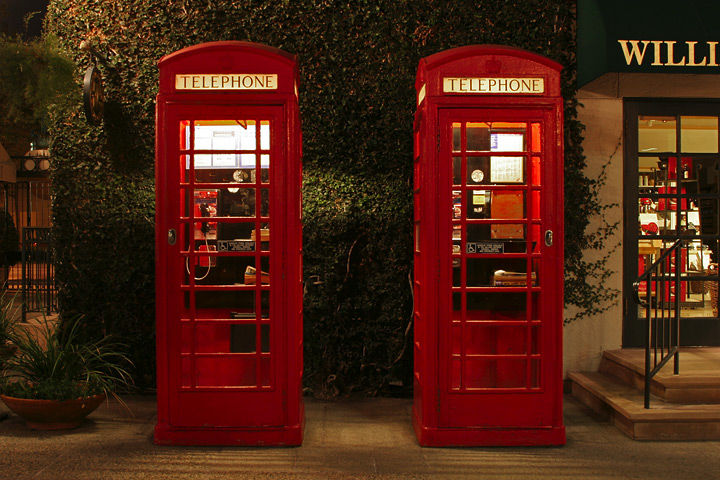
The existing red telephone boxes were seen by BT as no longer meeting the needs of users.

The Daily Mail claimed its campaigning had worked yet BT once again made it clear it had only ever been a trial, largely ignored by national media until 4 examples were painted in London to trial four different shades of yellow. BT explained it had "been an experiment" and that no final decision had been reached. Nonetheless, whilst they had sympathised with what the public saw as a cultural icon, BT then turned their attention to what customer research had established were embedded flaws in all of Britain's cast iron telephone boxes. They considered them 'outdated and no longer meeting the needs of the public, finding that few people like using them, and noted their expensive cost, difficult maintenance and how they could not be used by handicapped people' . Furthermore, the red phoneboxes were noted for a lack of ventilation and little space. Although British Telecom had begun introducing the yellow vandal proof '7A "Oakham" booth' in 1981 to several locations with limited floor space or extreme vandalism, it was with their imminent privatisation in 1984, that forced BT back to the drawing board. The result, announced publicly in early 1985 was a range of new telephone boxes, called the KX, which improved on the previous telephone boxes and addressed their concerns.

== Launch ==
In early 1985, British Telecom announced a £160 million modernisation scheme for the public telephone network inherited from the General Post Office. Described as "a major improvement to the public telephone service", the "new designs that were to be the most perfect telephone kiosks you could imagine." They were both BT's first standardised telephone booths and their first altogether, having only been privatised less than half a year earlier. The new telephone boxes were named the KX series. Whilst it is unknown what the initials stand for, it is believed the "K" stands for kiosk, following the Post Office telephone box naming system.

The introduction of the new kiosks was also to see the eventual replacement of all existing prior telephone boxes. In January 1985, Nick Kane, the Director of Marketing for BT Local Communications Services, announced the replacement plan and stated they were being replaced because they "no longer meet the needs of our customers. Few people like to use them. They are expensive and difficult to clean and maintain and cannot be used by handicapped people".

The first KX type to be installed, a KX100, was unveiled in Leicester Square, London though this was not the first installation location of the type. BT later stated the KX models "were cheaper to maintain, more resistant to vandalism and were designed to blend in with any surroundings. Special attention was paid to environmental considerations, acoustics, weather protection, lighting and ventilation after intensive market research was conducted into customers' needs. The designs assisted customers with disabilities and allowed access to wheelchair users."

The KX series was not the first attempt to replace the red telephone box with regards to easier access, lower maintenance and brighter lighting, as they follow Post Office Telephone's "Croydon" telephone boxes from the 1970's. The Croydon kiosks were experimental housings built by Post Office Telecoms London (South) around 1975 to replace the ageing red kiosks. They were designed in Croydon, Surrey and trialled locally in that area. The exact date is not known but there is speculation that they may date from 1972. The Croydon kiosks were initially unpainted stainless steel, but by 1982, BT London was painting them black with a bright yellow roof and a phone handset silhouette (instead of the word 'Telephone'). Open pedestal versions and door-free Croydons were built and whilst the trials were successful, the cost of the materials and assembly made it too expensive for BT to mass produce. The design was used nationally as a stop gap between 1983-1986 while the KX range was developed but untimately the Croydons were mostly removed from sites by 1988. Regardless, the design of the Croydon boxes proved an important influence on the KX100 and others in the KX range. It was also described as looking "quite stunning" and as influencing the Australian Telstra telephone boxes.

== Original models ==
The original KX telephone booths were designed by DCA (David Carter Associates) and re-engineered by GKN after an initial batch of pre production models from America proved flimsy. They are of light-weight construction using stainless steel struts affixed to a stainless steel rear panel and roof, into which anodised aluminum components formed frames around glass/acrylic windows. They were also fitted with sound proofing back boards and featured a windswept gap at the base to prevent litter from accumulating, and "better lighting." As had recently been retrofitted to several existing red telephone boxes, many of the coin-operated KX telephone boxes used the BT Payphone 600.

Kiosks of the KX series were introduced at a rate of approx. 5,000 a year, and by 1999, the combined total number of the KX series and inherited Post Office telephone boxes operated by BT had reached 137,000. There is confusion as to the actual number of each type of kiosk built with BT and GKN records missing. It is known that by 1996, the total number of stainless steel KX kiosks (KX100/KX200/KX300)in service with BT was 80,000, with a further 30,000 hooded/canopied BT phones in locations such as railway stations or shopping centres (including KX500 series, older wall board mounted units and the Oakham pedestal), and 15,000 old GPO era red boxes in heritage locations. From 1996, the KX+ was introduced at a rate of 5,000 a year until 1999, though later numbers were in fact on-site modular-upgrades of KX100. Exact numbers of each type produced remain hard to quantify as the various KX units were sold both to domestic and foreign operators such as KCom in Hull, Guernsey Telecom, and Telecom New Zealand; and used in BT's own international payphone ventures in Europe and the Isle of Man.

In 1999 the number of 'housed' public telephones operated by BT is known to have peaked at 137,000, up from the total of 81,000 in 1989. By 2017 the total number of housed payphones had dropped to 40,500, and by 2025 this is thought to have fallen to fewer that 14,000 housed payphones, many of which are vandalised and do not work. Of the operational BT kiosks remaining in 2023, approx. 2,000 were heritage models from the K8/K6 era and before.

Although green bins to dispose of used BT phonecards had been added to already existing kiosks in the mid/late 1980s, the phonecard-operated KX kiosks were the first to be introduced with them by default (although a minority of phonecard-operated KX kiosks did not feature the bin). BT further modified a number of these bins in late 1992 to prevent people from stealing disposed cards from them - as the cards were valued by collectors, some being rare and having trading values of hundreds of Pounds.

=== KX100 ===
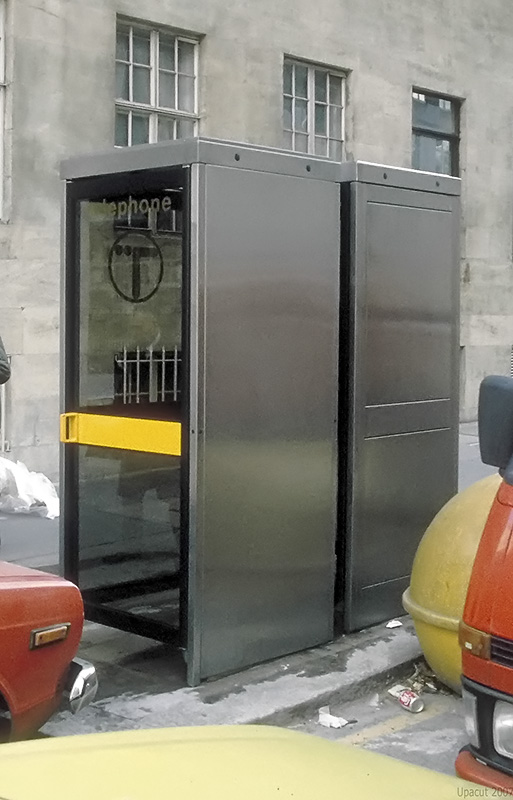
An early KX100 kiosk (right) alongside a later Mk2 model (left).

The first and most common KX, designed to be the direct successor to the K6, the KX100 is a four-sided rectangular box with a flat roof. Aside from the back panel, which is formed of stainless steel panels, the three other sides of the box are made of glass, with two large window panels set above and beneath a slim, black plastic modesty panel, also with a black plastic trim around the windows. The same three sides of the booth stop short of the ground to provide ventilation, another improvement on the non-ventilated K6, and for litter accumulation. Initial deliveries had cylindrical legs, for leveling on site, a flat-sheet roof with upturned edges and a multi-panel back. A slightly updated model known as the Mk2 soon followed, without the adjustable legs and with a single sheet back panel and the more familiar 'biscuit tin lid' roof.

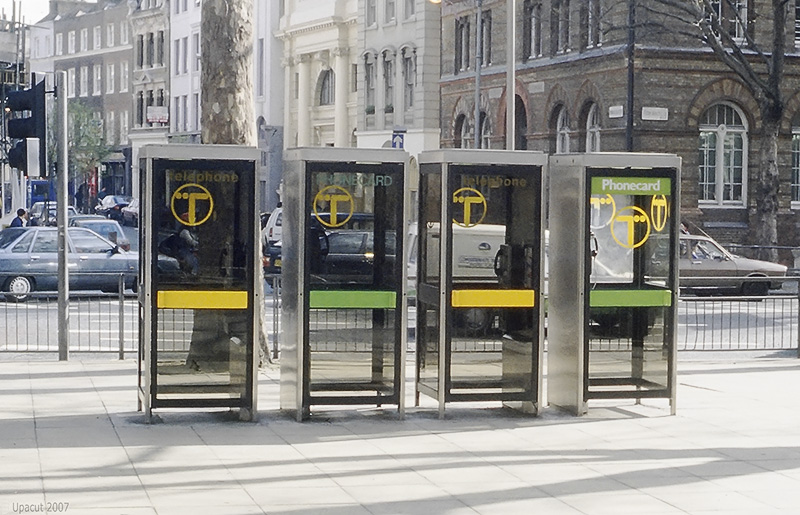
A line of KX100 kiosks with the original logo and insignia, during the changeover from smoked glass to clear.

At launch, KX100s had smoked glass windows with lettering and logos printed on the inside face. To improve visibility of the kiosks - in particular during daylight hours - the printing was first moved onto the outside surface of the glass and then the smoked glass was dropped altogether. Later kiosks were all fitted with clear glass.

The door of the kiosk has a light action and features a bright-coloured moulded plastic panel and handle for easier opening than previous boxes. For the first KX100s, this part was bright yellow, whilst the Phonecard variants used a bright green. The payphone inside the coin-operated version was originally yellow with a blue phone, but this was later phased out. The upper glass window panels carried the company logo, which upon launch, was the yellow dotted British Telecom 'T' logo. Changes to the panel and handle colour and BT logo were made in 1991 (see 1991 revamp), changes which adorn almost all remaining KX100s.

The KX100 was designed to be supplied with or without a door, depending on requirements, with the door version designed to be located on sites where complete weather and acoustic protection is needed. The overall unit was designed to be wide enough to allow wheelchair access. The open booth is designed for use on quieter sites yet still provides good weather protection and ease of access for the disabled. They can be used on single sites or suited back to back or side by side.

=== KX200/KX200D ===
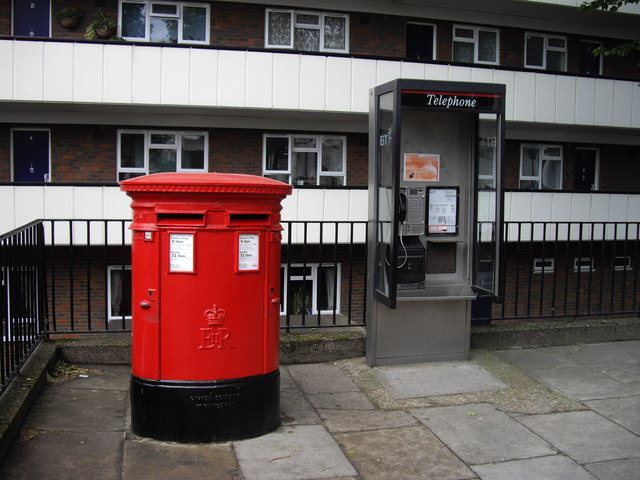
KX200 with a Type C pillar box.

The KX200 is a hooded unit provided as a single (KX200) or double (KX200D) pedestal version. Designed to be suitable for location in most street sites but also to be positioned indoors where acoustic protection is needed. They were designed to be especially accessible for people using wheelchairs and, as with the KX100, they were sometimes positioned in a row. In/on more confined spaces/sites, the KX200D model took up less space than a pair placed back to back.

A KX200 consists of a back panel, a flat roof which also supports two glass/acrylic panels which stretch down the booth but stop short of the ground at around knee level. The glazing panels originally displayed a BT logo, evolving over the years with the corporate identity.

=== KX300 ===
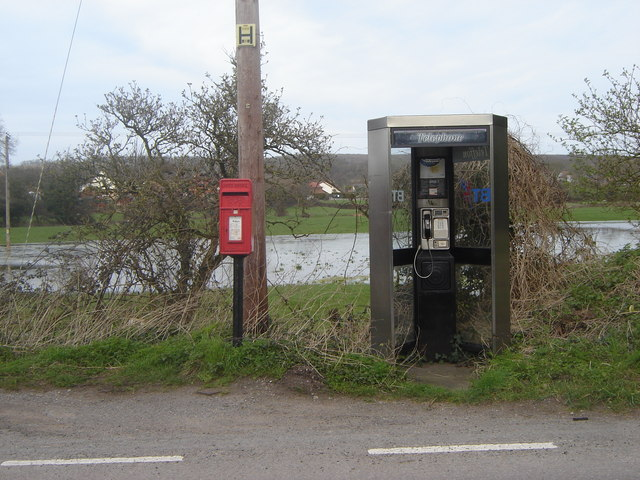
KX300 and lamp box.

The KX300 is a triangular unit designed so it could be used in groups, although many were erected alone. The triangular design of the KX300 ensures acoustic and weather protection. It was also designed to enable full use of available floor space and to provide better siting flexibility. As with the KX100, it has raised sides to prevent litter accumulation. There are two versions: a) pillar-mount assembly with two windowed sides, with payphone sited on the central pillar; and b) a panel mount assembly, where one of the windowed sides is omitted and steel panel(s) are used, with the payphone mounted on the inside of the acoustic steel panels along with fittings for directory holders.

It was essentially a triangular-based variant of the KX100. Initially KX300 were door free, but the transom sign could've removed and a standard KX100 door could be fitted. Doors became more common in the post 1991 livery era.

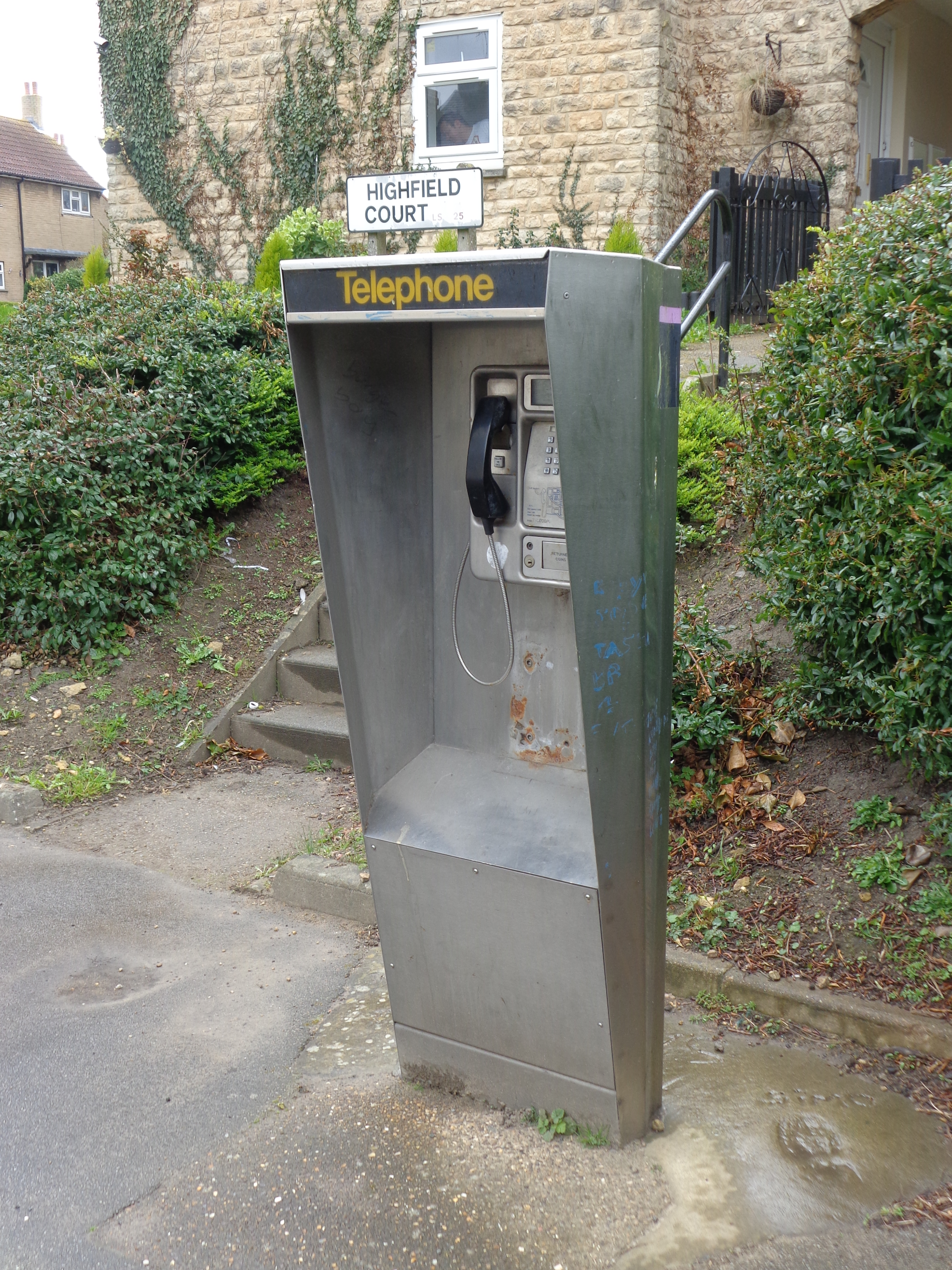
KX420 in Leeds.

=== KX410 and KX420 ===
The KX410 and KX420 are two hooded phone booths on posts created specifically for sites with little available ground space or sites which are prone to vandalism. As such, there is no space for directories or customer instructions, with the booth structures being made of aluminium alone, with the BT logo being on both the left and right of the structures, whilst hooded is a simple telephone. They were also considerably shorter than the other designs. The KX410, unlike the K420, was suitable for surface mounting.

These were not BT's first attempt at a post-situated telephone booth, as they follow the Booth 7A (or "Oakham" booths as they became known) which was a yellow booth used in areas of extreme vandalism introduced some years earlier.

=== KX520 ===
For use indoors, such as in shopping centres, another design, the KX520, was introduced. This is essentially a telephone mounted to a post with two small windows joined at the top of the booth to the left and right whilst topped by a hood, underneath which is an extending tab which features the BT logo.

== Public reaction ==
Red Phone Box, a website dedicated to the history of British telephone boxes, said that "nobody could deny the functionality of the designs as their main objectives were to be easy for disabled people to use and very easy to maintain, but everybody could deny the attractiveness of the designs." BT later said that although the public liked parts of the designs, such as "the fact that they were lighter, more airy and more accessible for people with disabilities than the traditional style, customers felt that there was still room for improvement. Popular opinion was that the square shape seemed clinical and that something softer and more rounded would be preferable." The scheme to replace the already existing red telephone boxes provoked a strong reaction from many members of the general public, with many disapproving of the removal of the red kiosks. Despite public campaigning to revert the plan to remove the red boxes, and unlike with the campaign protesting against the yellow telephone boxes several years earlier, BT did not respond, and whilst some red telephone boxes remained, the KX project was completed in 1988.

The KX's reputation has not improved with age. In 2001, The Guardian referred to the KX100 as "utterly bland" and noting that since its introduction, BT "has done its utmost to turn the phone box from one of the most famous and elegant pieces of street furniture into the most boringly ugly. It might be more vandal proof, more accessible and more modern (in the worst sense of the word) but the KX100, even when feebly capped in a fake Gilbert Scott-style crown, looks plain nasty."

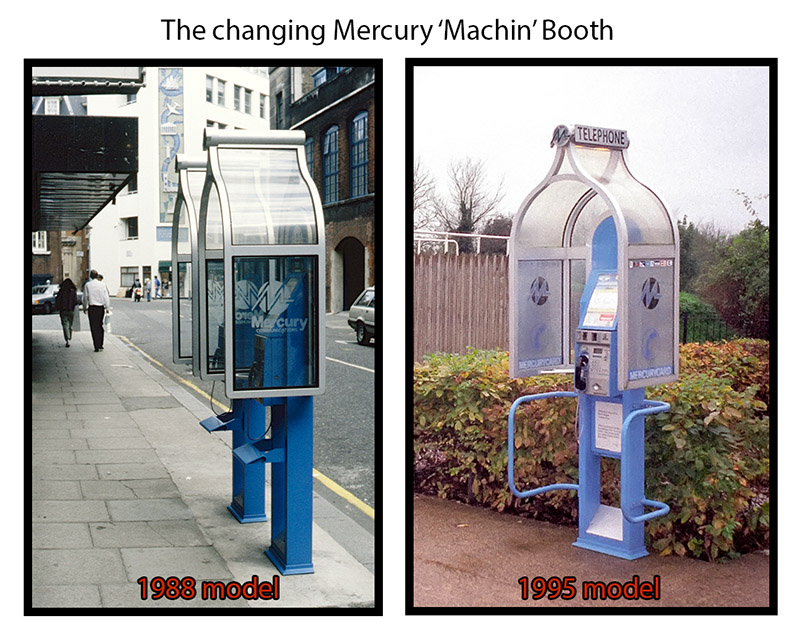
On the left, the Mercury booth as introduced in 1988. On the right, the much modified final version with roof-top signs, tubular walk-under guards and privacy glazing.

Alan Powers, an architectural historian who led the Thirties Society against BT newcomers in the mid-1980s, said "the clutter is appalling" and "nobody has made a worthy successor to Scott's [red telephone box]. They're all utterly banal. Though I have recently seen a new phone in Bloomsbury [London] that is very, very elegant. Maybe BT has finally got it right." It was reported in 2008 that a local from Ffair Rhos, Cadwgan, uses a KX100 yards from his house to contact friends and run his business, as well as cleaning it and opening his window to hear it call, noting he does this so that BT will not remove the box, and that he will not have a home phone installed to help this.

BT's telephone boxes in the UK soon saw a rival with the introduction of Mercury Communications own set of telephone booths, which were launched on 27 July 1988 with 26 booths at Waterloo station, London. The Machin-designed Mercury booth was at best accepted by the public and, at worst, positively hated. Examples of the response included "something from outer space", "pieces of fairground machinery" and "demented bird tables - complete with perches." but, and much more importantly to Mercury, they turned out to be non-profitable. The Mercury payphone sites closed down in 1995, with many of the sites taken over by Interphone, who went on to replace the Machin booths with their own housings.

In the 1988 Quality of Service report, the UK's public payphone system was listed as having a 96% reliability, compared to only 72% in 1987. As a result of the programme, there were 80,000 of the stainless steel design kiosks in service by 1996, in addition to 30,000 hooded or canopied phones and 15,000 of the original red telephone boxes. In 2001, BBC reported that the transition from the classic red telephone boxes to the KX telephone boxes was successful in reducing vandalism.

== 1991 revamp ==
BT changed their logo in 1991, now featuring a new typeface for the newly shortened name "BT" (prior to this they used their full name British Telecom), and an unpopular stylized figure of a piper. The KX100, 200 and 300 were updated accordingly. The coin-operated KX100 now featured a pink moulded plastic panel and handle, where as before it was yellow. Variations of the new logo now featured on all booths in place of the 'T' logo. The variations were namely a coloured version, a grey version and a larger, grey piper on its own. The typeface used to identify the type of box atop the entrance (i.e. "Telephone" or "Phonecard") was changed, now featuring an italicized serif font, often beneath a red line. Certain boxes in mostly Welsh-speaking parts of Wales use "Teleffon" instead of "Telephone" on the box. The KX410 and 420 were not revamped, and remain today in their original 1985 guise. The logo on the KX520 features a full colour version of the BT logo.

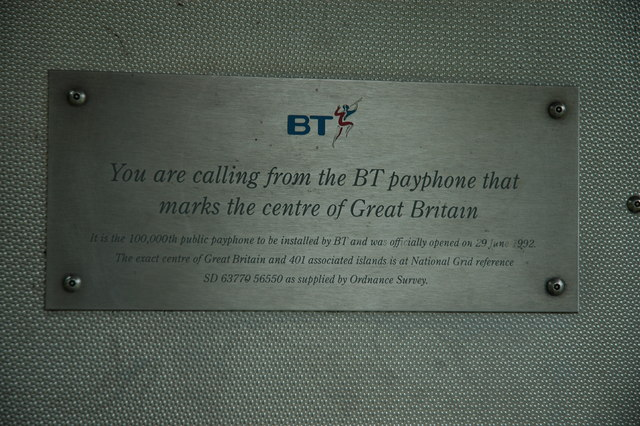
The commemorative plaque inside the kiosk hosting the 100,000th BT public payphone.

The 1991 re-brand was followed by the installation of the BT's 100,000th public payphone on 29 June 1992, housed inside a mk.2 KX100 kiosk at Dunsop Bridge, Lancashire, on account that the village had recently been named the closest to the centre of the British Isles. Upon installation, the glass was etched with UK towns and cities and BT also mounted a commemorative plaque internally (since stolen from the kiosk) to explain its significance reading "You are calling from the BT payphone that marks the centre of Great Britain." In fact, the phone is 4.2 miles (6.8 km) from the true centre. The telephone box was unveiled by Sir Ranulph Fiennes, and in BT's A1141 list of unique alphabetical Telephone Exchange codes, the code for Dunsop Bridge is DSB. Whilst the BBC noted in 2002 that the box is the village's "monument", local postmaster and shop owner Phil Woodhead said the town did not capitalise on its status, saying "there is only that payphone really... we haven't put up big signs or anything like that. If this was a bigger town with more shops, then maybe we would do something, but because we are so small, there is really no-one to push it." The kiosk was awarded Grade II listed status in October 2026.

== KX+ ==
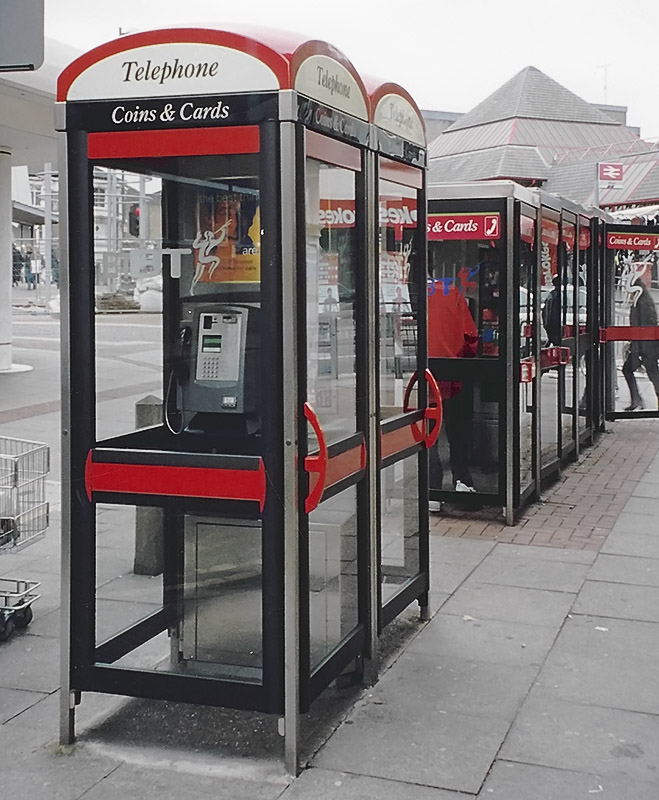
A pair of KX+ kiosks, erected alongside an existing group of KX100s.

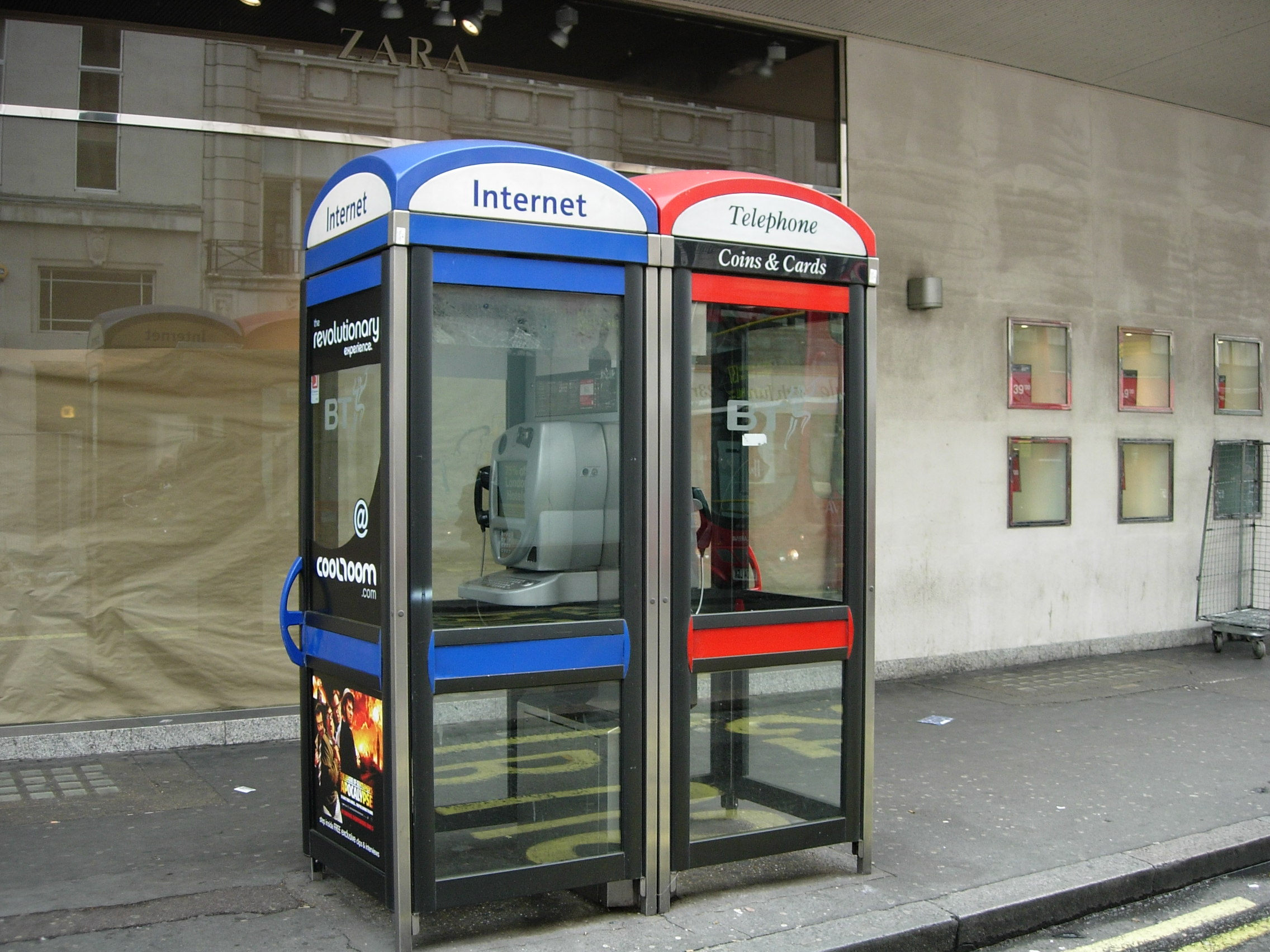
A KX+ and modified Internet booth

In 1996, BT, having acknowledged the negative reaction to the original KX models, made an attempt to win the public over and revisited the KX100 and built upon its design to improve its appeal and add some character. The new updated version was named the KX+, also known as the KXplus, the KXPlus, the KX100 Plus or the KX100+. It is essentially an updated and taller version of the KX100. It differs from the KX100 in that the 'waistband' in its door and sides is lower, and the colour used in the midsection trim panel and remodelled door handle also now matches the newly introduced trim panel at the top. In a nod to earlier Post Office kiosks and following the negative feedback on the KX100's design, it features a domed, plastic roof (modelled on those of the K2 and K6). This said, the dome also brought other benefits to BT. The enhanced model was now taller and more visible than the boxes of BT's competitors, and it also offered valuable extra space for future developments, such as public wi-fi hotspot equipment. The earliest KX+ kiosks carried signage on the door and side lintels and the domed roof. The interior of the booths are fitted with a large illuminated display panel. They also contained a small seat and a shelf for writing or placing property. They featured a lower handle on the door to help customers with disabilities and a new closing mechanism to make the door more robust.

The original version featured red trim panels and a red-domed roof. This colour was chosen for its high visibility, and also to recall the red colour of the iconic Post Office kiosks. In late 2003, BT introduced internet connectivity to select kiosks. These booths feature distinctive blue colour to distinguish them from kiosks with standard telephone equipment (see photo), and also carry the BT Openzone logo. These kiosks have been described as perhaps "the last throw of the dice to save the telephone box", with Red Phone Box noting "the idea is good but the practicality isn't, you are unable to print out your internet findings in these boxes as a printer and paper would create mess." The payphone within the KX+ inside takes cash, phonecards, credit cards and chargecards, with these payment options clearly written on the outside of the box rather than using red or green colour coding which was the practice of the KX series as well as elder red telephone boxes that had been updated accordingly.

The first KX+ kiosks appeared in Autumn 1996, with the first being placed in London, and within its first year, over 5,000 KX+ kiosks had been installed. Its launch also saw the end of production for the KX100. Some KX100s went on to be retrofitted with KX+ style domes - in effect a cost-reduced model, known during its development as the K Excel but supplied as KX Minus. Both the KX+ and the KX Minus were designed by DCA and manufactured by GKN.

== Later developments ==
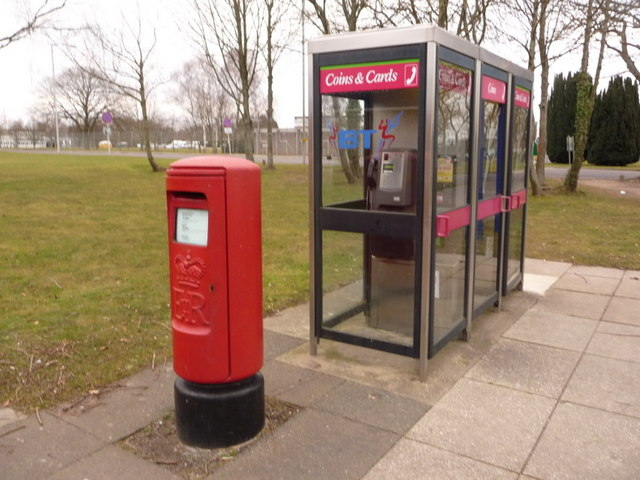
A row of KX100s that operate by both coins and phonecards

Whilst thousands of KX, KX+ and KX Minus kiosks remain today (2026), from 1993 BT did start to reintroduce the iconic K6 design telephone boxes in heritage sensitive places where the 1930s style was more appropriate. There were limited instances of KX models being removed and replaced by K6 but it was more common for restored K6 to be placed in locations where no public telephone had previously ever stood. Parliament Square in London is one such example where 4 K6 were added in around 1993, along with 60 others in Westminster

BT phonecards were introduced in the early 1980s, using hologram technology. In 1995 the cards were modified to feature ic chips which required new payphones capable of reading the new card. Some payphones could handle both types. One of these models was the 1995/96 BT Payphone 2000, a new type of phonecard telephone. It was installed in high usage sites such as airports and railway stations. This payphone featured a large LCD with information to assist the user. It could read old and new Phonecards, BT Chargecard and bank debit and credit cards. The on-screen language could be also changed between English, Welsh, French, Italian and Spanish languages to help users whose first language is not English. BT Phonecards were phased out in 2002 once payment by debit cards became more common and as easy. Today, it is still possible to use prepaid telephone cards issued by third parties in BT phone boxes by manually keying in the card access number and PIN.

Around 1985, BT also introduced Britain's first credit card-operated public payphone, "Creditcall", which like the Phonecard, was another cashless payphone service, enabling customers to make calls using major credit cards. It was installed on a trial basis in at Heathrow Airport and Waterloo station in London. Another development that became possible after the deregulation of the telephone industry of 1996 was that many companies followed in Mercury Communications' footsteps by erecting their own kiosks, including Spectrum Interactive and Cable & Wireless.

Perhaps in another attempt to sustain public usage of payphones, many KX100 payphone kiosks were modified from 2005 onwards to house a cash machine on one side, taking the shape of the KX+. In 2005, BT announced they were scrapping plans to remove 200 telephone boxes in rural Yorkshire owing to their importance to the geographically isolated areas.

They also launched a series of internet payphones called the Multi.phone, also known as the Multiphone, in 1999. The touch screen terminals display a range of "hot buttons relevant to the needs of the modern traveller and consumer", with one of the buttons leading to BBC News Online. By January 2001, 600 Multi.phones were installed, but to revive the fortunes of their extensive network after usage fell 37% in two years, BT announced a six-month promotion during which the phones would be totally free for internet use. A BBC critic reviewed the Multi.phone in a negative light, saying it made the reviewer "nostalgic for the old callbox pips. Sometimes, as BT once put it so perfectly, "it's good to TALK"." After the six month free trial was over, keyboards were added to the Multi.phones.

In 2004, BT considered plans where their telephone boxes could be used to download music, turning them into "virtual jukeboxes", where anyone owning an iPod or portable music player would be able to go into a phonebox and download a song, being able to pay using a credit card or a BT charge card. The concept behind the boxes providing access to music was seen as an opportunity to attract mobile phone users, who long ago deserted phone boxes into BT facilities, Regardless, the plans were abandoned.

By 2017, the total number of BT-owned telephone boxes had fallen to 40,000 with half of these under threat of scrapping over the following five years. As of 2024, there are fewer than 20,000 public telephone boxes nationwide. That year the Twentieth Century Society applied to preserve three KX100 boxes as listed monuments: the 100,000th to be installed, at Dunsop Bridge in Lancashire, in England; a box which has retained the original BT livery, near Maaruig on the Isle of Harris in Scotland; and an experimental solar- and wind-powered telephone box at the Centre for Alternative Technology in Machynlleth in Wales.

=== ST6 ===
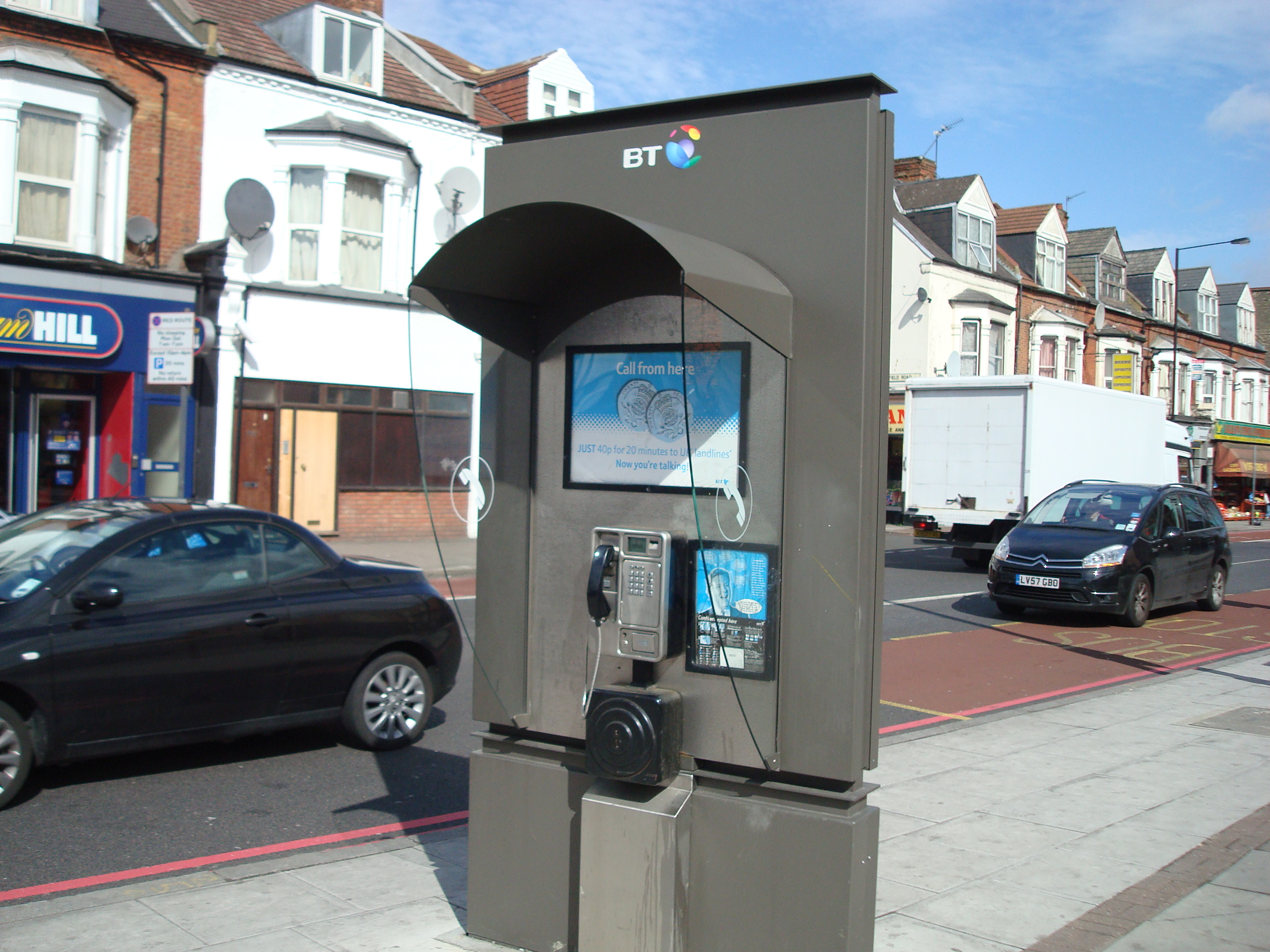
ST6 phone box

Whilst BT was reported to have stopped making telephone boxes in January 2001, citing loss of profits due to the increasing popularity in mobile phones, production had resumed by the time of the introduction of the ST6 (Street Talk 6) in June 2007, which seemingly saw the end of the KX series. The ST6, a collaboration between BT and public advertising company JCDecaux, is a unit that incorporates a telephone on one side and a scrolling advertising billboard on the reverse. The idea is that the advertising would pay for the running of the phone. The first ten ST6 kiosks were installed in Richmond and Ealing, London. BT announced in May 2012 that it was going to repair and restore 1,300 KX telephone boxes.

=== LinkUK ===
The latest venture from BT, in 2017, combining advertising with public telephone service was the LinkUK kiosk - an electronic advertising hoarding with a tablet, two USB charging ports, and a phone providing free calling to UK numbers (plus free WiFi).

== See also ==
- Telephone booth
- Red telephone box
- BT
- Telephone card
