= Telephone booth =

Small structure furnished with a payphone

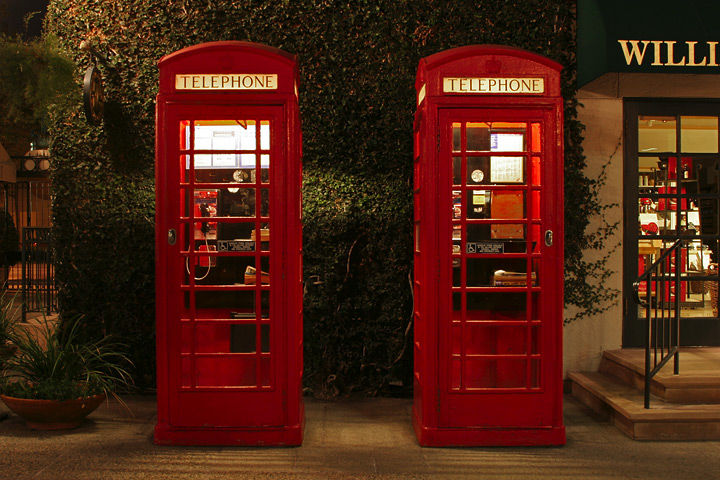
Replicas of British red telephone boxes in South Lake, Pasadena, California

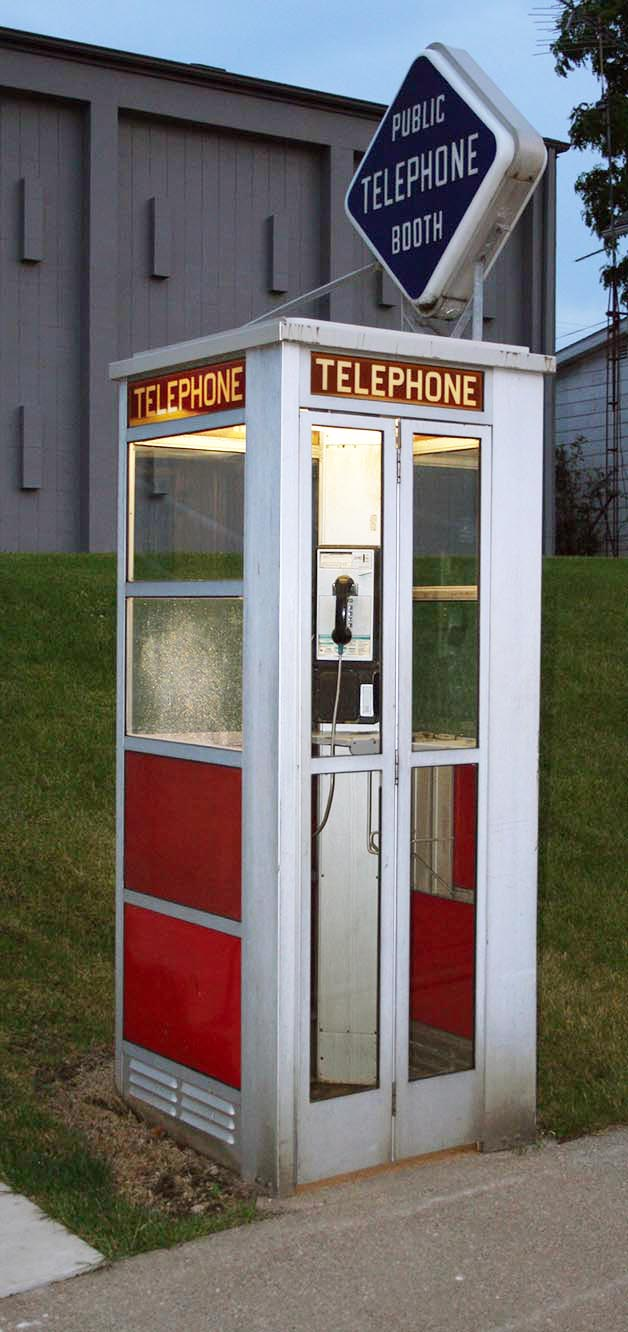
Classic style mid-20th century American telephone booth in La Crescent, Minnesota, May 2012

A telephone booth, phone booth, telephone kiosk, telephone call box, telephone box or public call box is a structure furnished with a payphone and designed for a telephone user's convenience; typically the user steps into the booth and closes the booth door while using the payphone inside.

In the United States and Canada, "telephone booth" (or "phone booth") is the commonly used term for the structure, while in the Commonwealth of Nations (particularly the United Kingdom and Australia), it is a "phone box".

Such a booth usually has lighting, a door to provide privacy, and windows to let others know if the booth is in use. The booth may be furnished with a printed directory of local telephone numbers, and in a formal setting, such as a hotel, may be furnished with paper and pen and even a seat. An outdoor booth may be made of metal and plastic to withstand the elements and heavy use, while an indoor booth (known as a silence cabinet) may have more elaborate design and furnishings. Most outdoor booths feature the name and logo of the telephone service provider.

== History ==
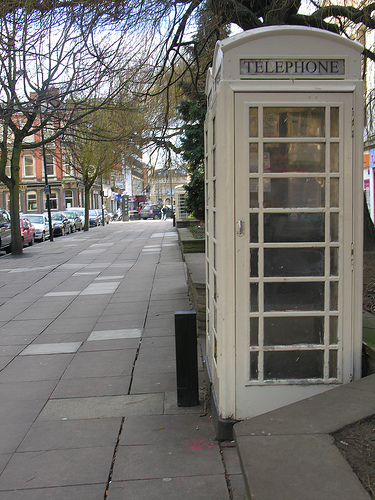
A Hull K6 telephone box

Telephone booth in Tokyo, 2021

The world's first telephone box called "Fernsprechkiosk", was opened on 12 January 1881 at Potsdamer Platz, Berlin. To use it, one had to buy paper tickets called Telefonbillet which allowed for a few minutes of talking time. In 1899, it was replaced by a coin-operated telephone.

William Gray is credited with inventing the coin payphone in the United States in 1889, and George A. Long was its developer.

In the UK, the creation of a national network of telephone boxes commenced in 1920, beginning with the K1 model which was made of concrete; however, the city of Kingston upon Hull is noted for having its individual phone service, Kingston Communications, with cream coloured phone boxes, as opposed to classic royal red in the rest of Britain. The Post Office was forced into allowing a less strident grey with red glazing bars scheme for areas of natural and architectural beauty. Ironically, some of these areas that have preserved their telephone boxes have now painted them red.

In the 1940s, at military bases during WWII, outdoor booths started to appear. But in general they were most commonly placed indoors, as they were mostly made of wood and didn't handle exposure to the elements well. This changed in 1954, when the Airlight outdoor telephone booth was introduced. Being made of glass and aluminium, they were designed especially for the outdoors and originally intended to serve motorists traveling on the highway.

=== Public call office ===
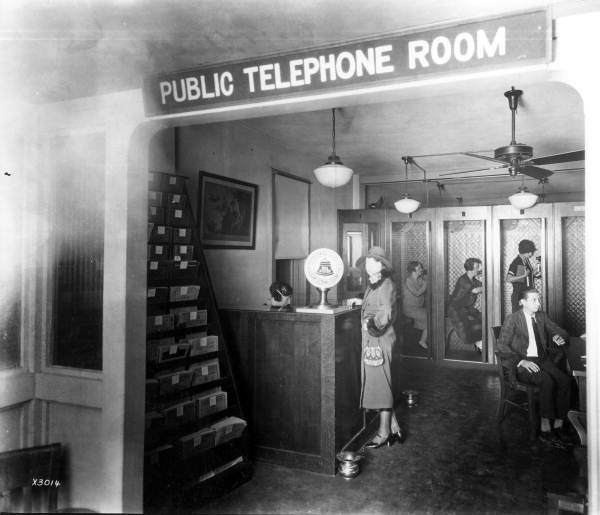
Public telephone room, Miami, Florida, 1925, with a row of telephone booths seen along the back wall. Customers would request a call at the front desk; when the connection was made the customer would be directed to go to one of the booths for the call.

A public call office (PCO), also known as a call office, call shop or public telephone room, is a shared public telephone facility, typically operated from a storefront or kiosk containing multiple telephones or coin phone booths attended by a clerk or operator. Public call offices were established in areas where private telephone ownership was limited, allowing members of the public to make and receive local or long-distance calls for a fee. Early public call offices were commonly located in shops, hotels, railway stations, and post offices.

The concept existed in many countries during the expansion of telephone networks in the late 19th and 20th centuries, particularly in communities where household telephone service was uncommon or unavailable. In later decades, the term became especially associated with the widespread network of staffed payphone facilities in India and Pakistan until the growth of the mobile phone and an expanded network made them essentially obsolete by the late 1990's.

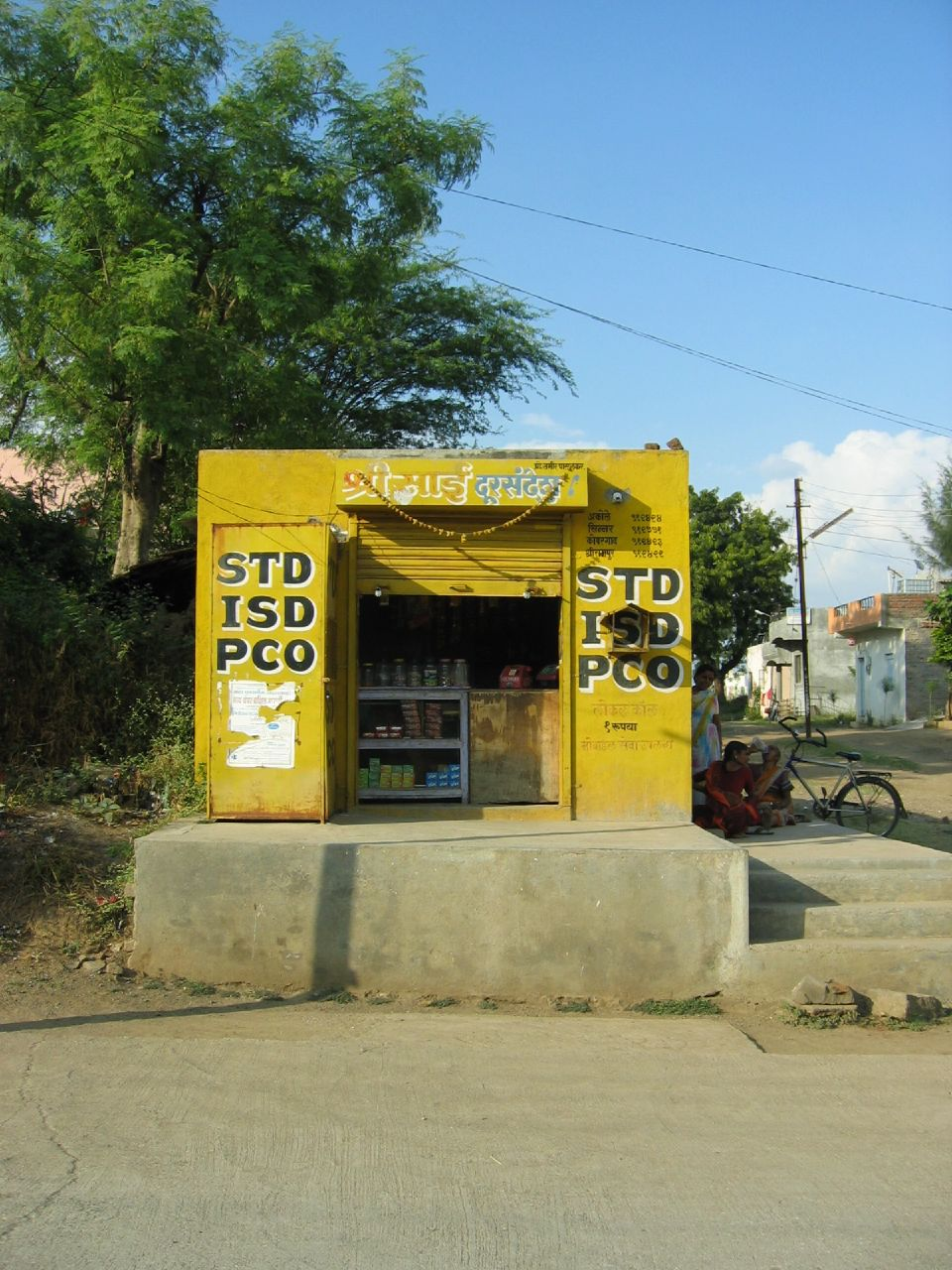
Public call office in India

== Design ==
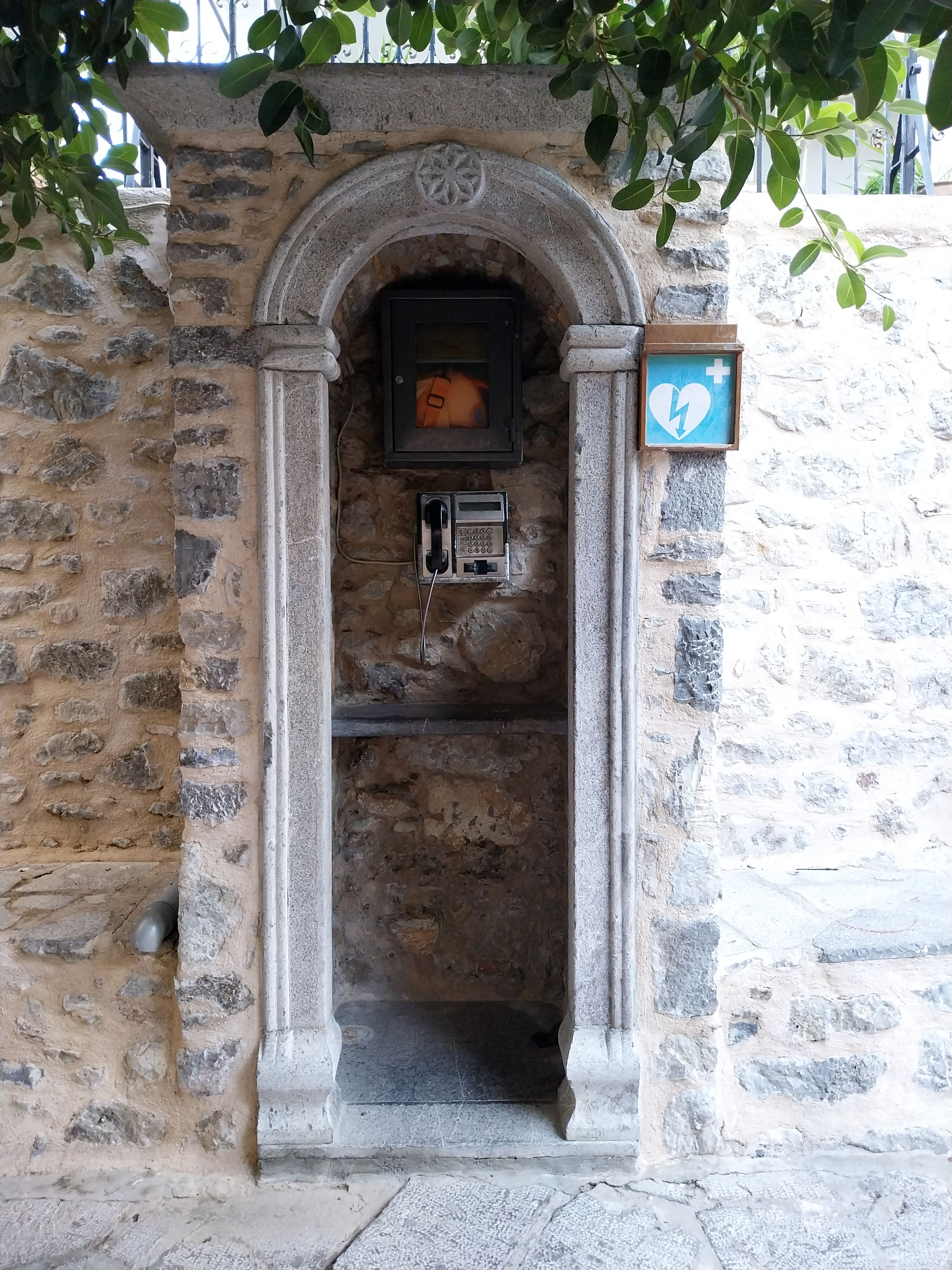
Mesta (Chios) telephone booth

Starting in the 1970s, pay telephones were less commonly placed in booths in the United States. In many cities where they were once common, telephone booths have now been almost completely replaced by non-enclosed pay phones. In the United States, this replacement was caused, at least in part, by an attempt to make the pay telephones more accessible to disabled people. However, in the United Kingdom, telephones remained in booths more often than the non-enclosed setup. Although still fairly common, the number of phone boxes has declined sharply in Britain since the late 1990s due to the rise in use of mobile phones.

Many locations that provide pay-phones mount the phones on kiosks rather than in booths—this relative lack of privacy and comfort discourages lengthy calls in high-demand areas such as airports.

Special equipment installed in some telephone booths allows a caller to use a computer, a portable fax machine, or a telecommunications device for the deaf.

The Jabbrrbox, an enclosed structure for installation in open plan offices, was inspired by the telephone booth.

== Cultural impact ==
The ubiquity of the phone booth led to its depiction in fiction. In comic books published by DC Comics, the telephone booth is occasionally the place where reporter Clark Kent discards his street clothing and transforms into the costumed superhero Superman. Some films and television series have reused or parodied this plot device. The 1965–1970 television series Get Smart used a phone booth, among other devices, as a secure means of entering CONTROL headquarters. The 2002 film Phone Booth takes place almost entirely in a telephone booth; a 2023 retrospective article notes that "the obsolescence is to the film's advantage."

La cabina ("The Telephone Box") is a 1972 Spanish television film directed by Antonio Mercero, and written by himself and José Luis Garci, starring José Luis López Vázquez. It first aired on 13 December 1972 on Televisión Española. In the 35-minute film, a man becomes trapped in a telephone booth, while passersby seem unable to help him. The film won the 1973 International Emmy Award for Fiction, the only Spanish programme to have won it.

The 1986 comedy film Clockwise features John Cleese's character vandalising a phone in a booth in frustration after it malfunctions. The scene played on the public perception in Britain at the time that telephone booths were frequently out of order.

The cover photograph of the album Deadlines (Strawbs) shows an upside-down man trapped inside a telephone booth full of water. The background shows a flat landscape during sunset circumstances. Photo Hipgnosis.

== Privacy ==
Phone booths have been subject to wireless surveillance by law enforcement. For example, the landmark U.S. Supreme Court case of Katz v. United States involved the Constitutional question of whether the Federal Bureau of Investigation (FBI) could install a listening device outside of the booth.

== Recent developments ==
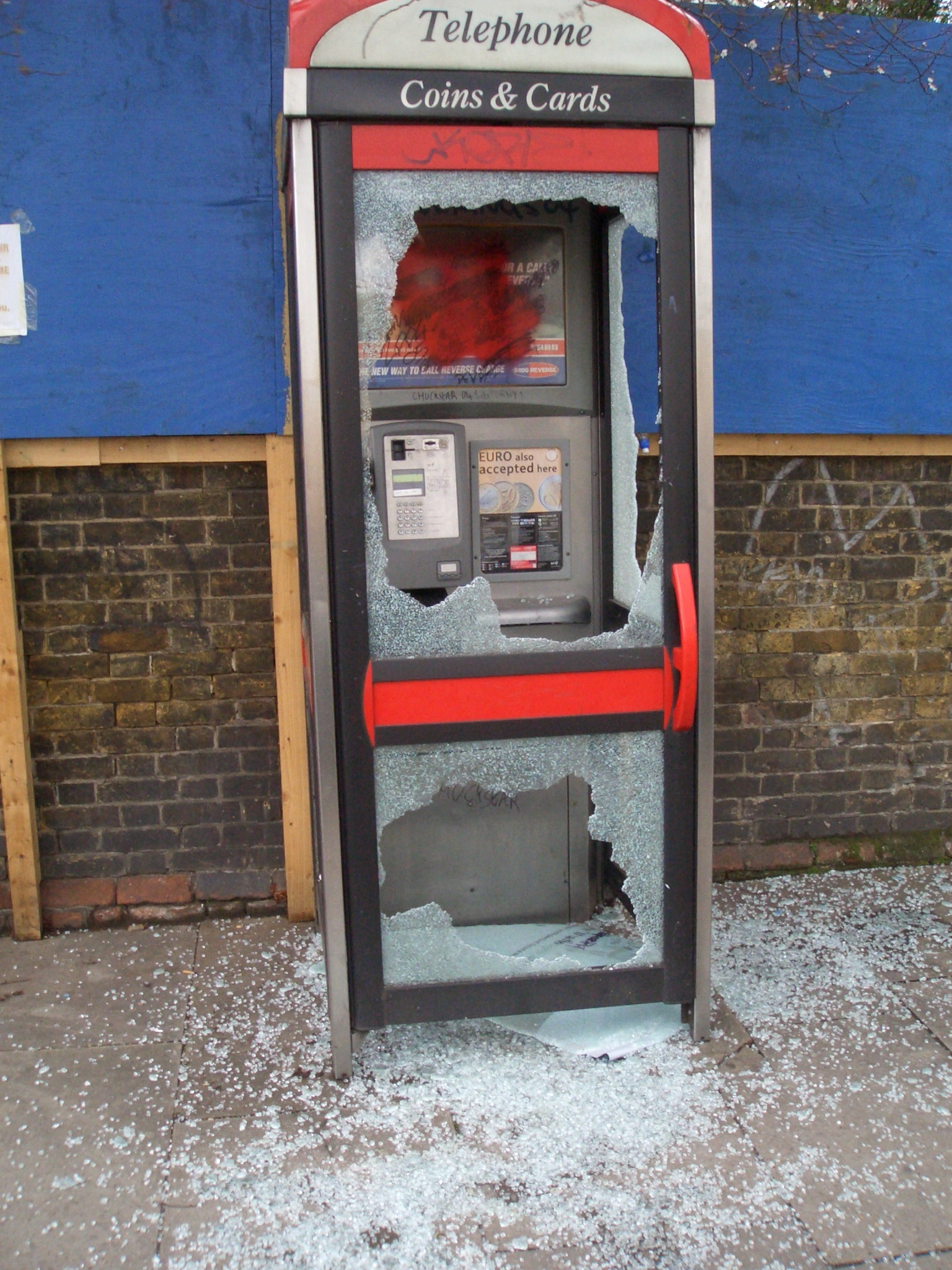
A vandalized KX+ phone box in London

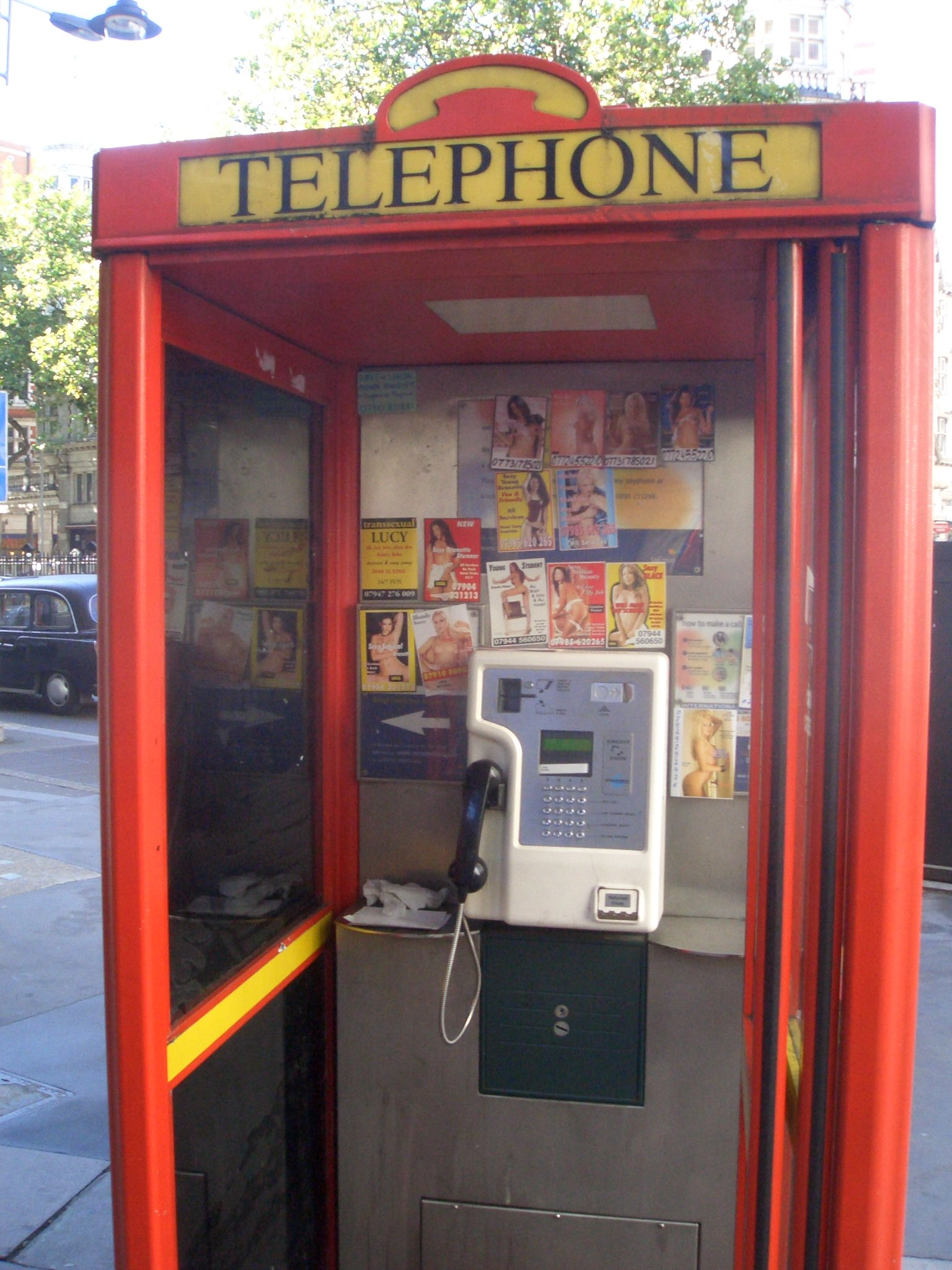
Tart cards are often found in phone boxes in London advertising the services of call girls

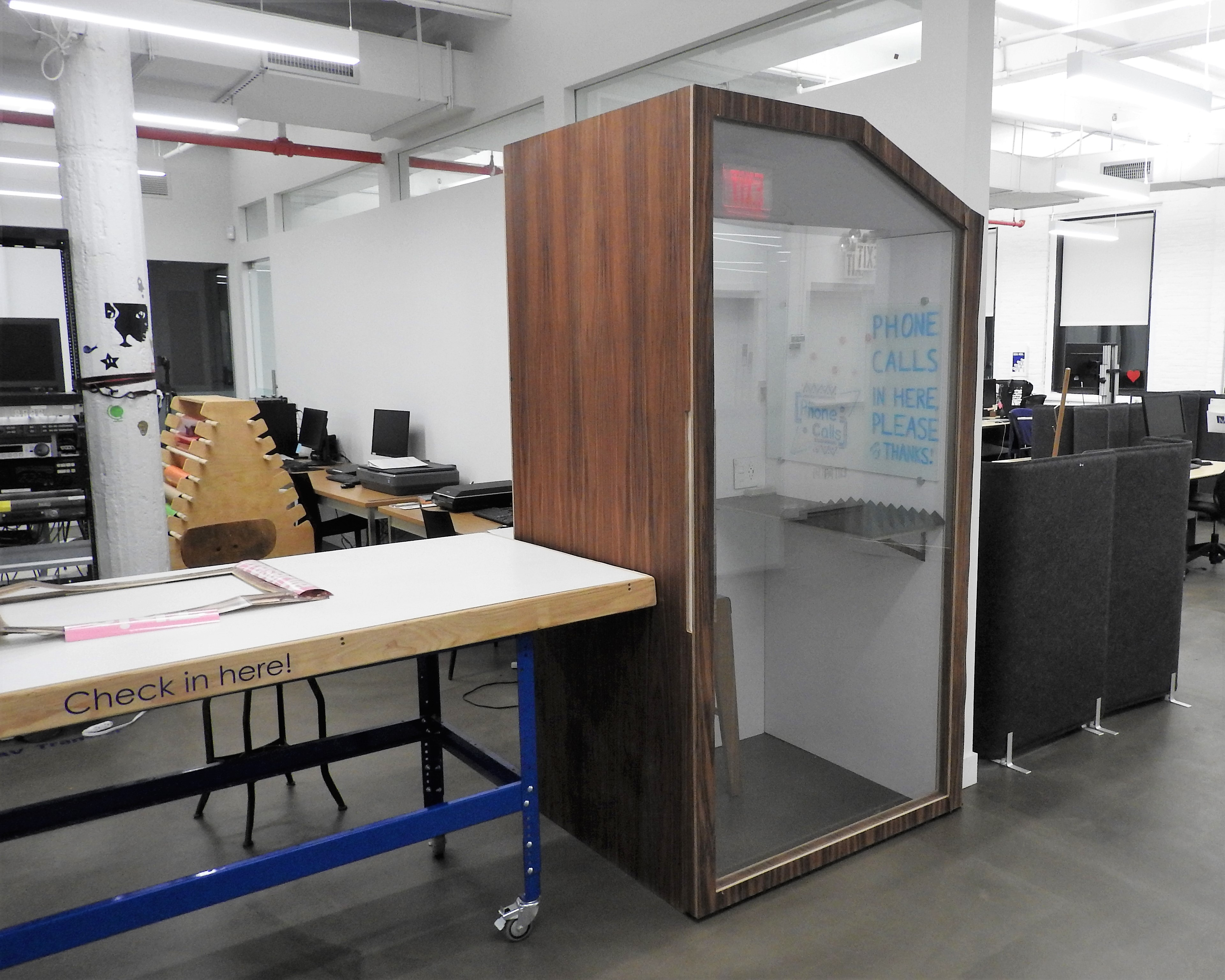
Booth in an office, for using one's own phone

=== Wireless services ===
The increasing use of mobile phones has led to a decreased demand for payphones, while the increasing use of laptops is leading to a new kind of service: in 2003, service provider Verizon announced that it would begin offering wireless computer connectivity in the vicinity of its phone booths in Manhattan. In 2006, the Verizon Wi-Fi telephone booth service was discontinued in favor of the more expensive Verizon Wireless' EVDO system.

Wireless access is motivating telephone companies to place wireless stations at locations that have traditionally hosted telephone booths, but stations are also appearing in new kinds of locations such as libraries, cafés, and trains. Phone booths have been slowly disappearing with the growth in use of mobile phones.

=== Vandalism ===
A rise in vandalism has prompted several companies to manufacture simpler booths with extremely durable pay phones.

=== Withdrawal of services ===
Pay phones may still be used by mobile/cellular phone users if their phone becomes loses power, is stolen, or for other emergency uses. These uses may make the complete disappearance of pay phones in the near future less likely.

==== Australia ====
Under the Universal Service Obligation, the Government of Australia legally requires Telstra to ensure standard phone services and payphones are "reasonably accessible to all people in Australia". Some communities, particularly in remote regional areas, rely on payphones, as well as people who do not have access to a mobile phone.

At their peak in the early 1990s, there were more than 80,000 public phone boxes across the country. By June 30, 2016, according to the Australian Communications & Media Authority there were about 24,000 payphones across Australia. On August 3, 2021, with 15,000 public phones remaining across Australia, Telstra announced that all calls to fixed line and mobile phones within Australia from public phones would become free of charge, and that it had no plans to further eliminate public phones.

==== Belgium ====
In Belgium, majority state-owned telco Belgacom took the last remaining phone booths out of service in June 2015.

==== Czech Republic ====
In June 2021 the last phone booth in the Czech Republic was closed and dismantled.

==== Denmark ====
In December 2017 the last three public telephone booths in Denmark had their telephones removed. They were situated in the town of Aarhus.

==== Finland ====
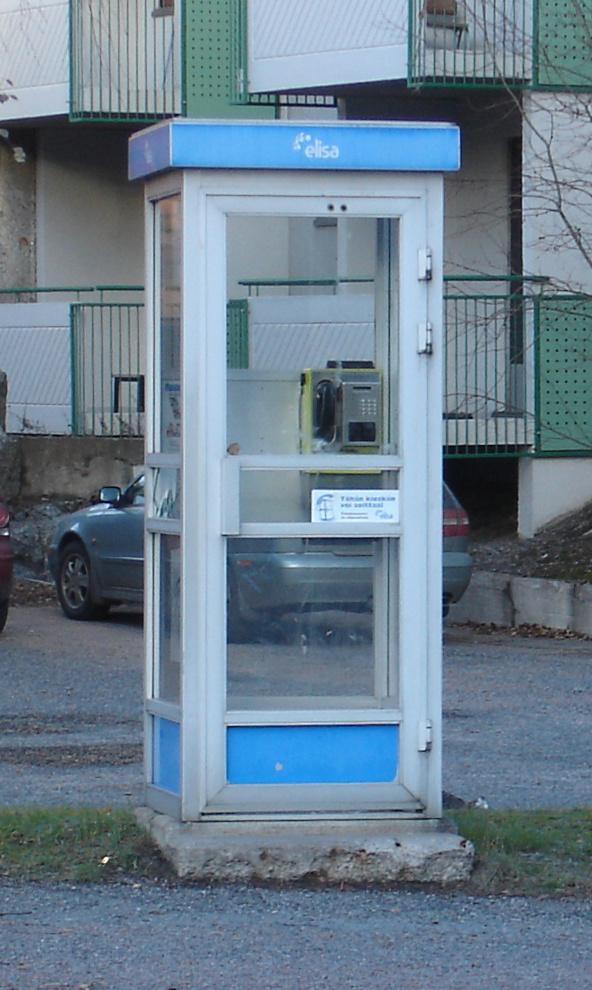
Telephone booth in Hervanta, Tampere, Finland, in 2006

By 2007, Finnet companies and TeliaSonera Finland had discontinued their public telephones, and the last remaining operator Elisa Oyj did so early the same year.

==== France ====
According to Orange CEO, Stéphane Richard, there were only 26 public phone booths still operating in France as of 2021. The "Macron law" of 2015 ended Orange mandatory maintenance of a public phone booth network, its decline in use being caused by the cell phones era. These are, by law, maintained in rural area where there is no cell phone service. Consequently, they are removed once the area is properly covered by at least one mobile phone operator.

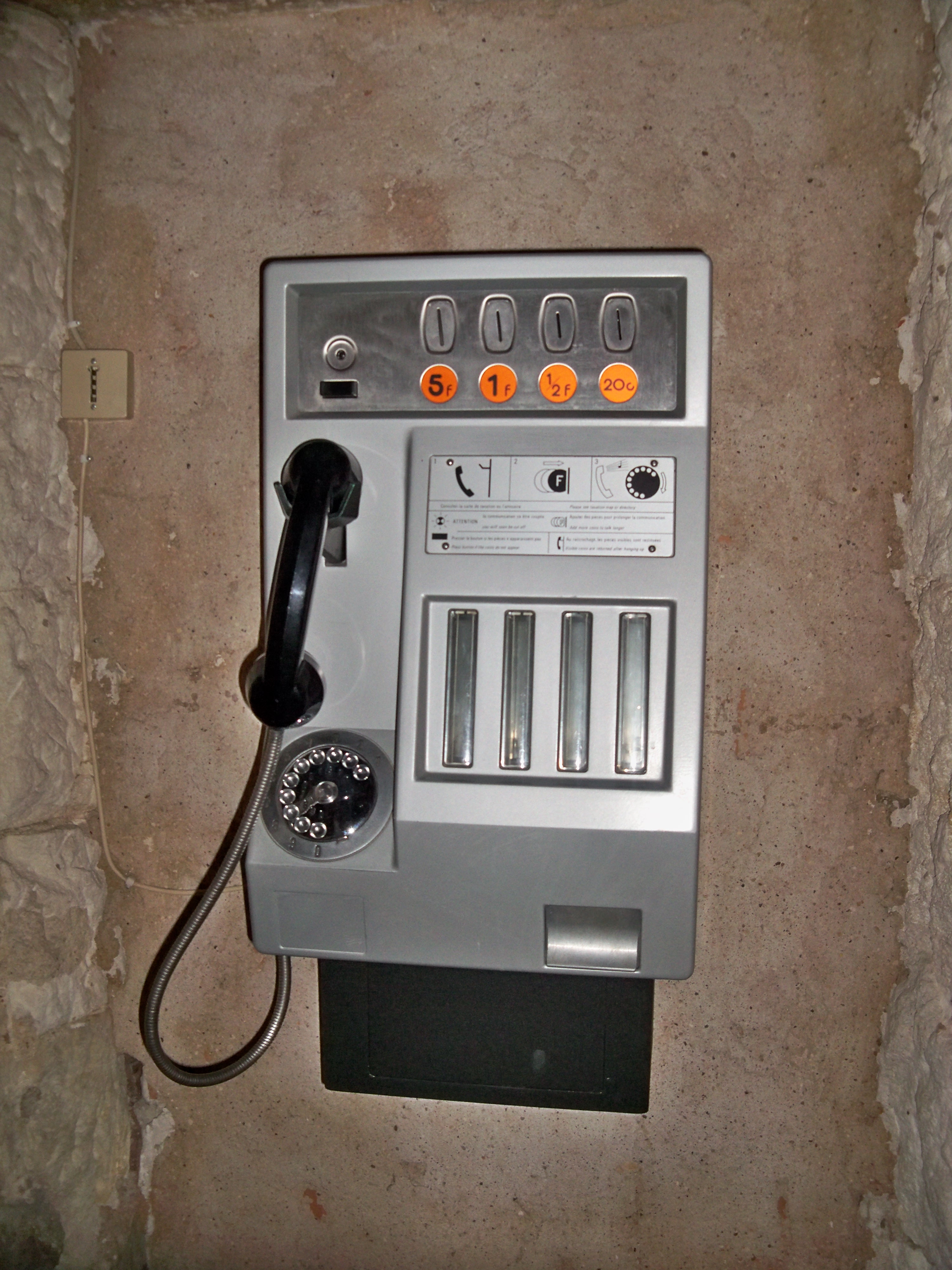
A telephone booth in France prior to the switch to the euro. Coins are Francs on the labels. It also uses the rotary dial and the 20 centimes coin, which means the device dates back to circa 1980.

==== Germany ====
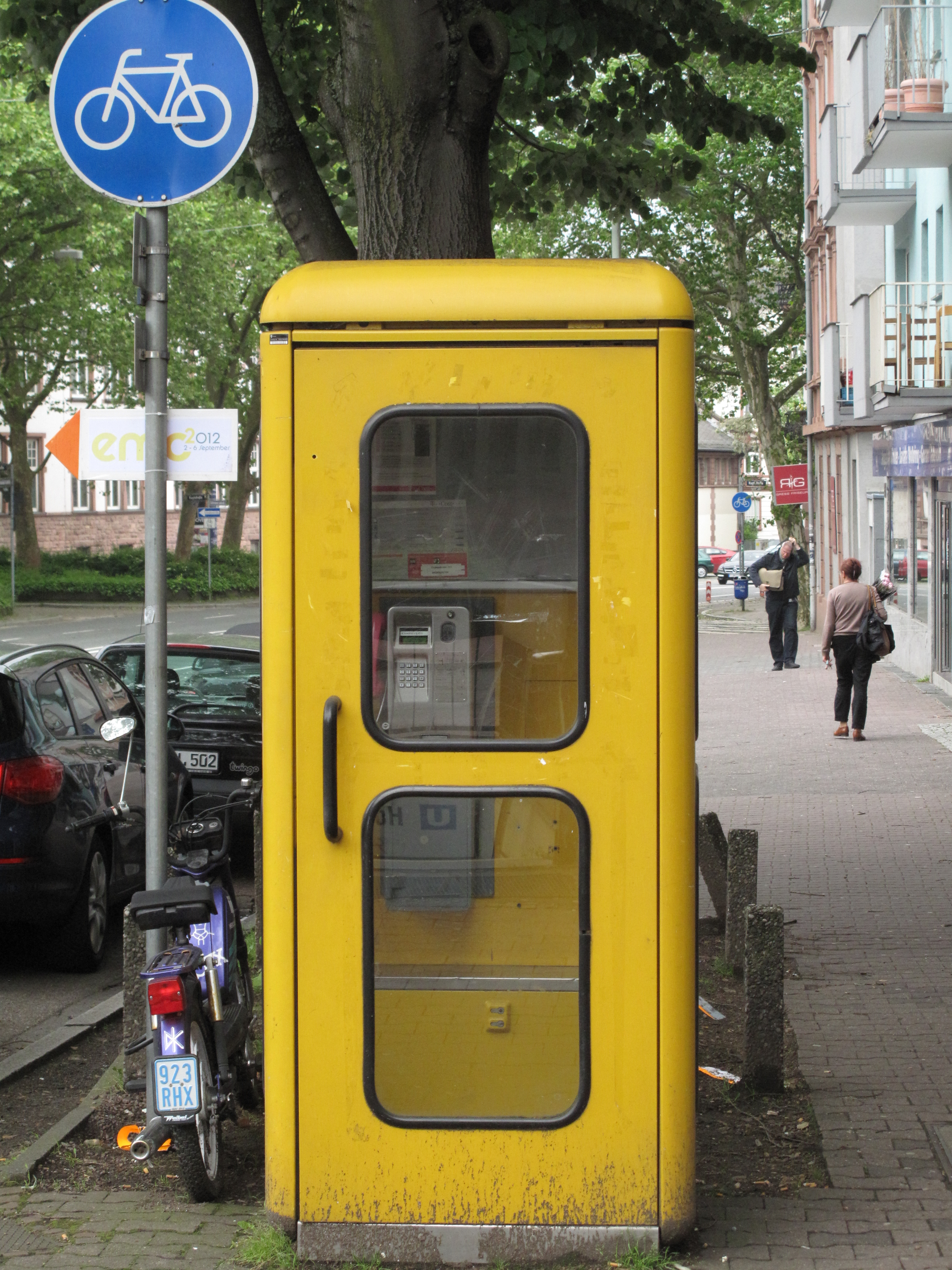
Phone booth in Germany (2013)

Up to 160,000 public telephone booths were operated by Deutsche Telekom in Germany. At the end of 2021, an amendment to the Telecommunications Act removed the obligation to provide the population with public telephone booths. Until then, the number of phone booths had already dropped to 12,000 (2022). From November 2022 public phones stopped accepting coins and from late January 2023 phone service was discontinued altogether. The remaining public telephones are being dismantled until mid-2026.

==== Ireland ====
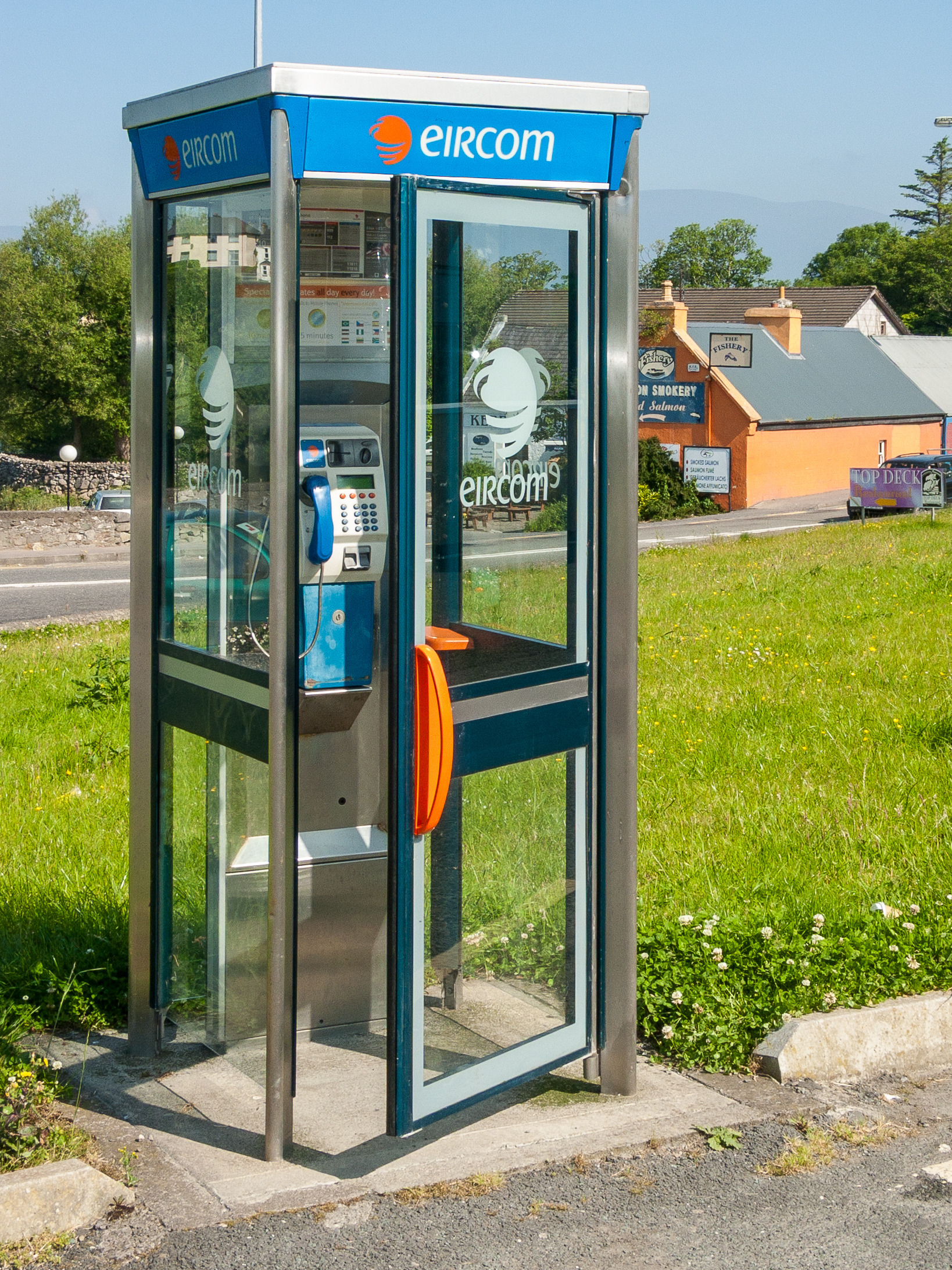
Telefone booth in Ireland 2007

Eir, the Universal Service Obligation carrier with regard to payphones, has been systematically removing payphones which fall under the minimum requirement for retention, of a rolling average of one minute of usage a day over six months.

As of June 2019, 456 locations retained payphones (with none in the entirety of County Leitrim); this was down from 1,320 in March 2014.

==== Italy ====
In May 2023 AGCOM established that TIM no longer has the obligation to guarantee the availability of telephone booths, with the exception of "places of social importance", such as hospitals (with at least ten beds), prisons, and barracks with at least fifty occupants. TIM will also be able to decommission booths in mountain refuges, while ensuring access to the mobile telephone network. AGCOM declared that 99.2% of public telephones are already covered by a mobile network with at least 2G technology (May 2023). In September 2023 over 90,000 booths which do not fall into the above-mentioned exceptions began being removed.

==== Jordan ====
In 2004, Jordan became the first country in the world not to have telephone booths generally available. The mobile/cellular phone penetration in that country has become so high that telephone booths had been rarely used for years. The two private payphone service companies, namely ALO and JPP, closed down.

==== Norway ====
The last functioning phone box in Norway was taken out of service in June 2016. However, 100 phone boxes have been preserved around the country and are protected under cultural heritage laws.

==== Sweden ====
The first telephone booth in Sweden was erected in 1890. In 1981 there were 44,000, but by 2013, only 1,200 remained, with the removal of the last one in 2015. A survey showed that in 2013, only 1% of the population in Sweden had used one during the previous year.

==== United Kingdom ====
The red telephone kiosk is recognised as a British icon and the BT Group still hold intellectual property rights in the designs of many of the telephone boxes, including registered trademark rights. BT is steadily removing public telephone kiosks from the streets of the UK. It is permitted to remove a kiosk without consultation provided that there is another kiosk within 400 m (1,300 ft) walking distance. In other cases, it is required to comply with Ofcom rules in consultation with the local authority. Some decommissioned red telephone boxes have been converted for other uses with the permission of BT Group, such as housing small community libraries or automated external defibrillators.

==== United States ====
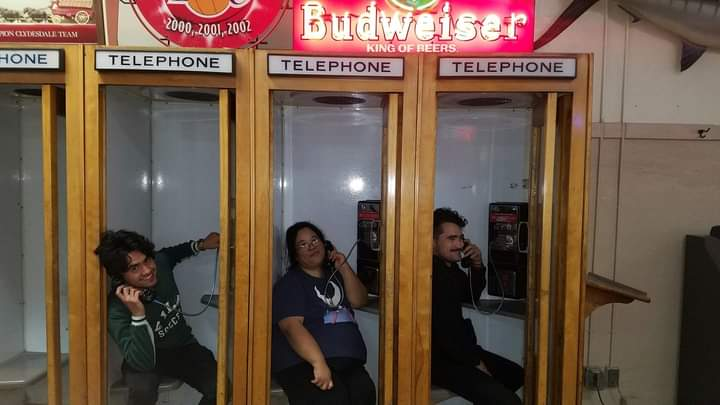
Telephone booths within the dining area of Philippe The Original in Los Angeles.

Beginning in the 1990s, many large cities began instituting restrictions on where pay phones could be placed, under the belief that they facilitated crime. In 1999, there were approximately 2 million phone booths in the United States. Only five percent of those remained in service by 2018. In 2008, AT&T began withdrawing pay phone support citing profitability, and a few years later Verizon also left the pay phone market. In 2015, a phone booth in Prairie Grove, Arkansas was placed on the National Register of Historic Places. New phone booth installations do sometimes occur, including the installation of a phone booth at Eaton Rapids' city hall.

In 2018, about a fifth of America's 100,000 remaining pay phones were in New York, according to the FCC. Only four phone booths remain in New York City, all on Manhattan's Upper West Side; the rest have been converted into WiFi hotspots. Incoming calls are no longer available, and outgoing calls are now free. In February 2020, the city confirmed that despite a plan to remove dozens of pay phones, the iconic booths would continue to be maintained.

=== Advertising ===
Many telephone boxes in the United Kingdom are now used for advertisements, bearing posters, with the development of "StreetTalk" by JCDecaux. This is in addition to the ST6 public telephone introduced in 2007 which is designed to feature a phone on one side and a JCDecaux-owned advertising space on the otherside. The advertising pays for the cost of maintaining the phone.

In 2018, the UK Local Government Association drew attention to "Trojan" telephone boxes. These are telephone boxes whose main purpose is advertising. A loophole in planning law allows these to be erected without planning permission and the LGA is seeking to close this loophole.

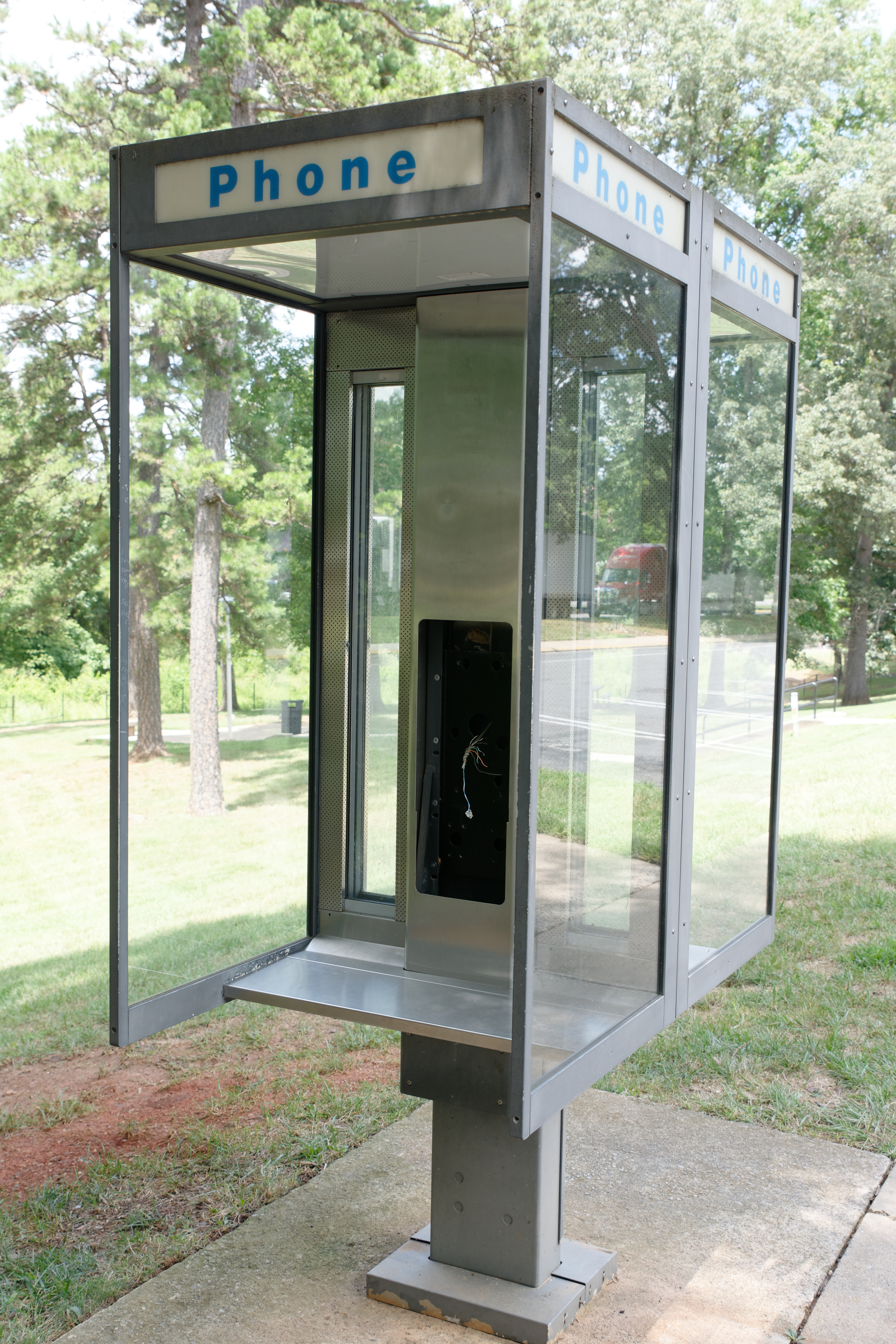
Partially enclosed pay phone in North Carolina, typical of many early replacements for telephone booths in the United States, continuing an enclosed space on three sides without the booth.

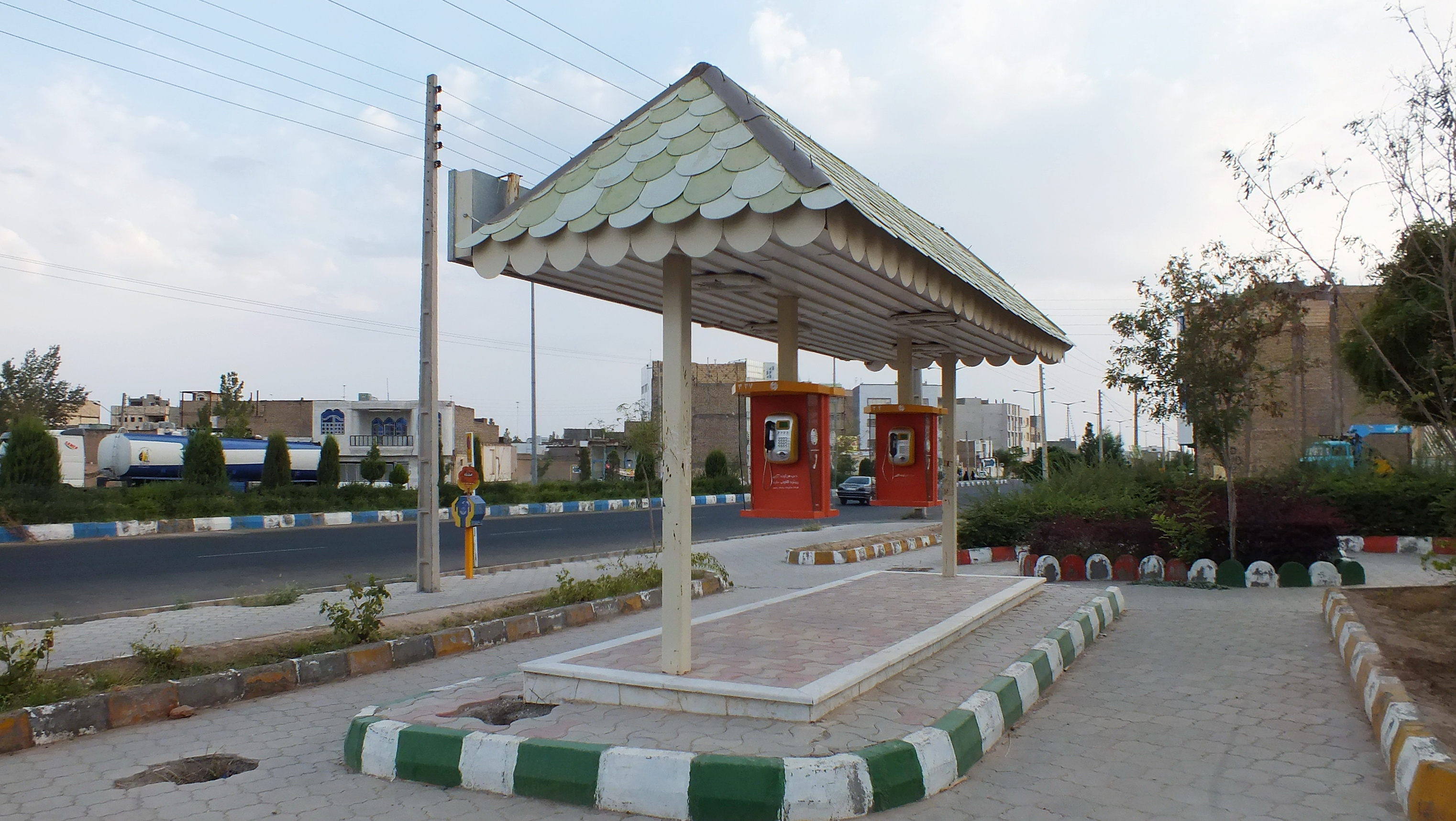
Public telephones in Kashmar, Iran; such structures replaced earlier booth enclosed telephones late in the 20th century

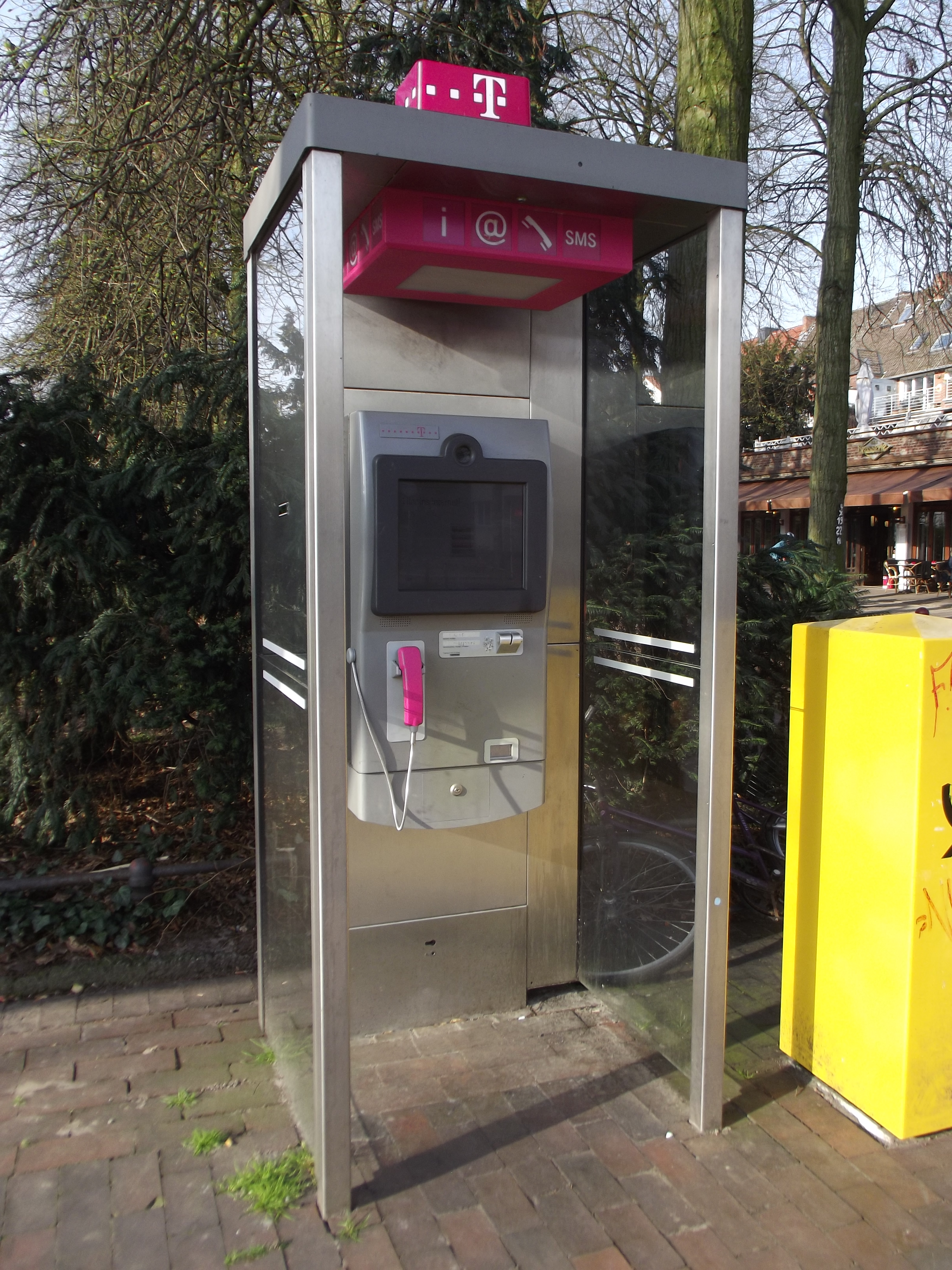
Pay telephone with internet access in Münster, Germany. March 2014, still using the old booth format but without a door.

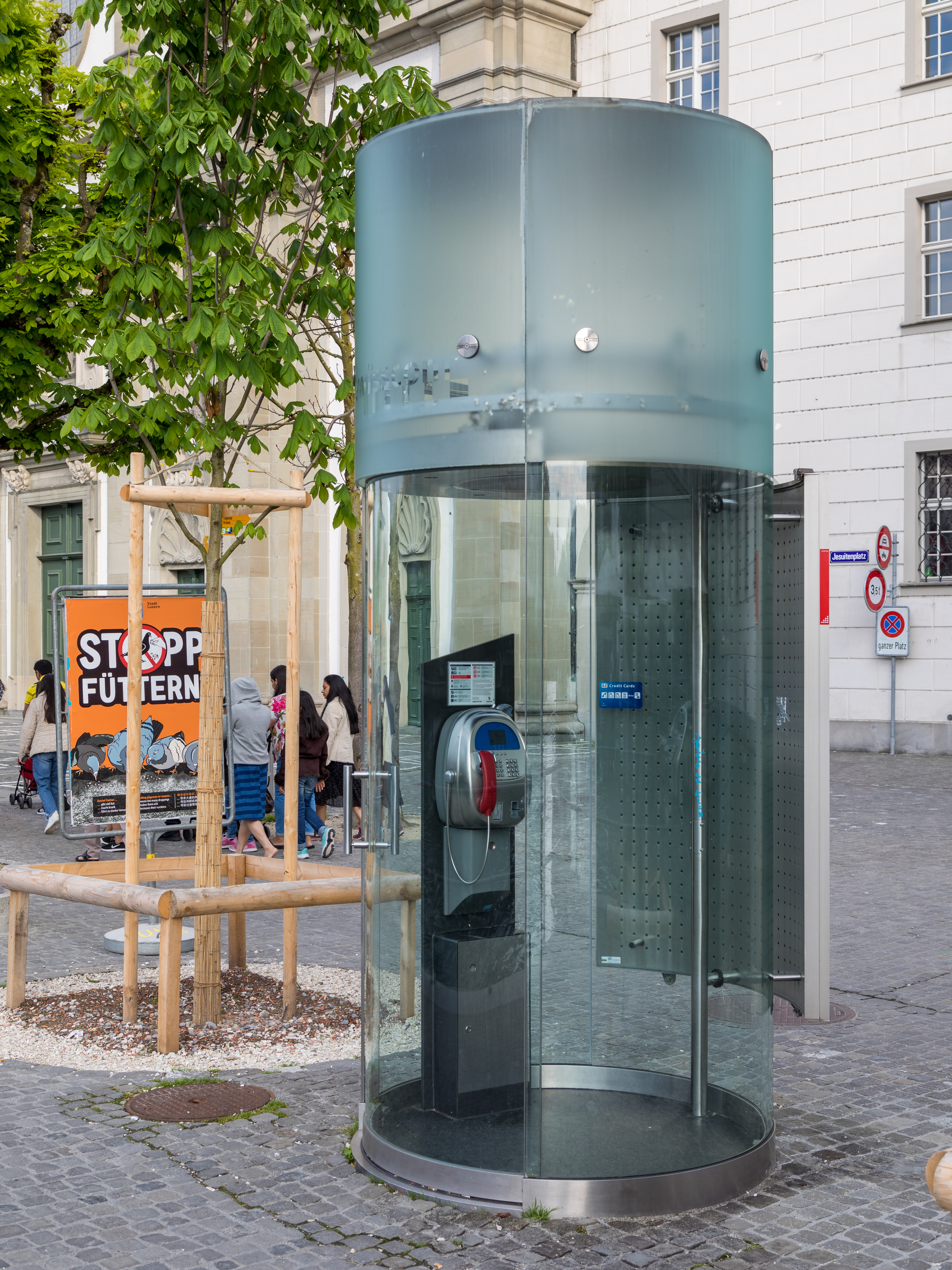
Modern telephone booth in Lucerne, Switzerland

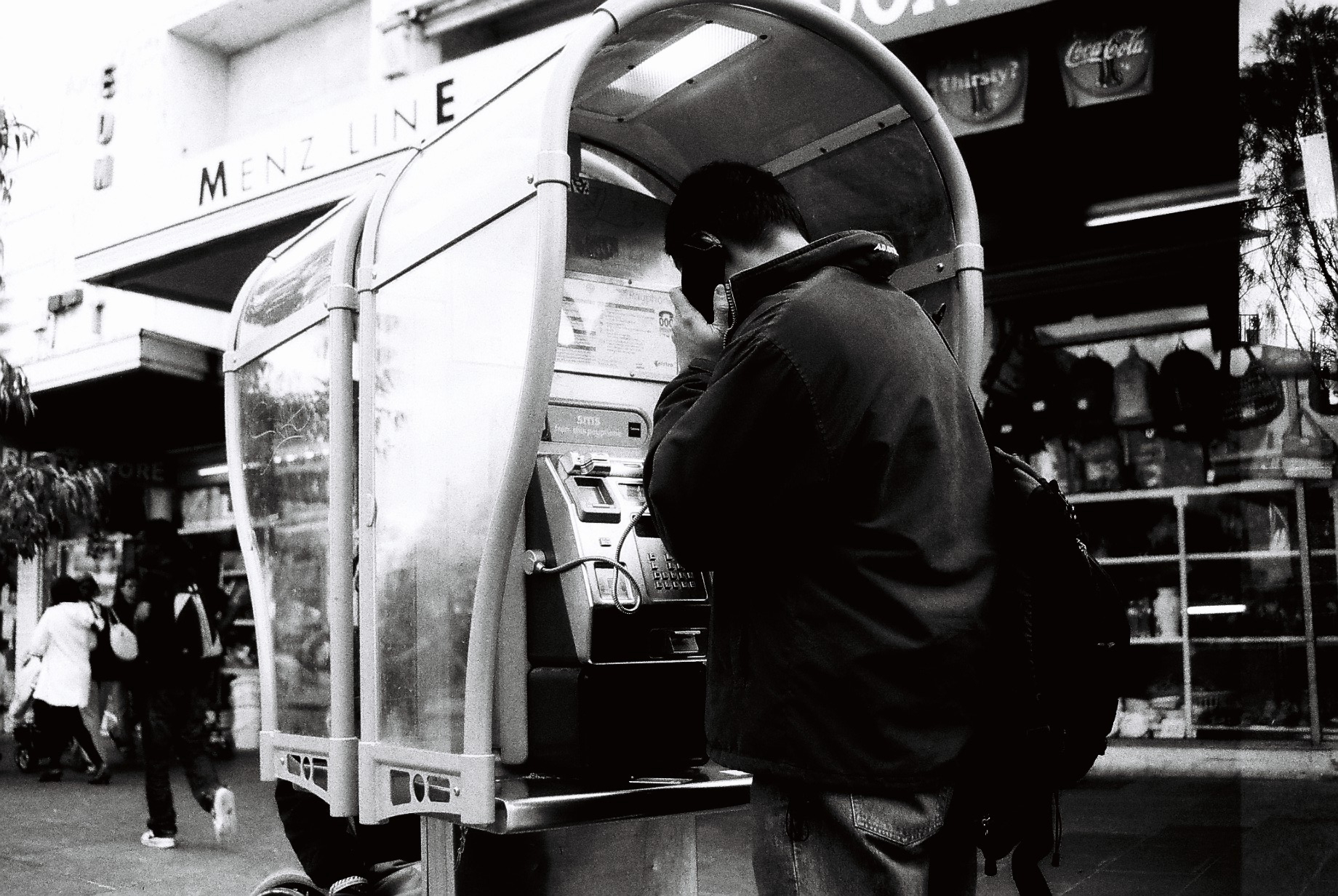
An example of a person using a Telstra phone box in Victoria, Australia; used after telephone booths were phased out.

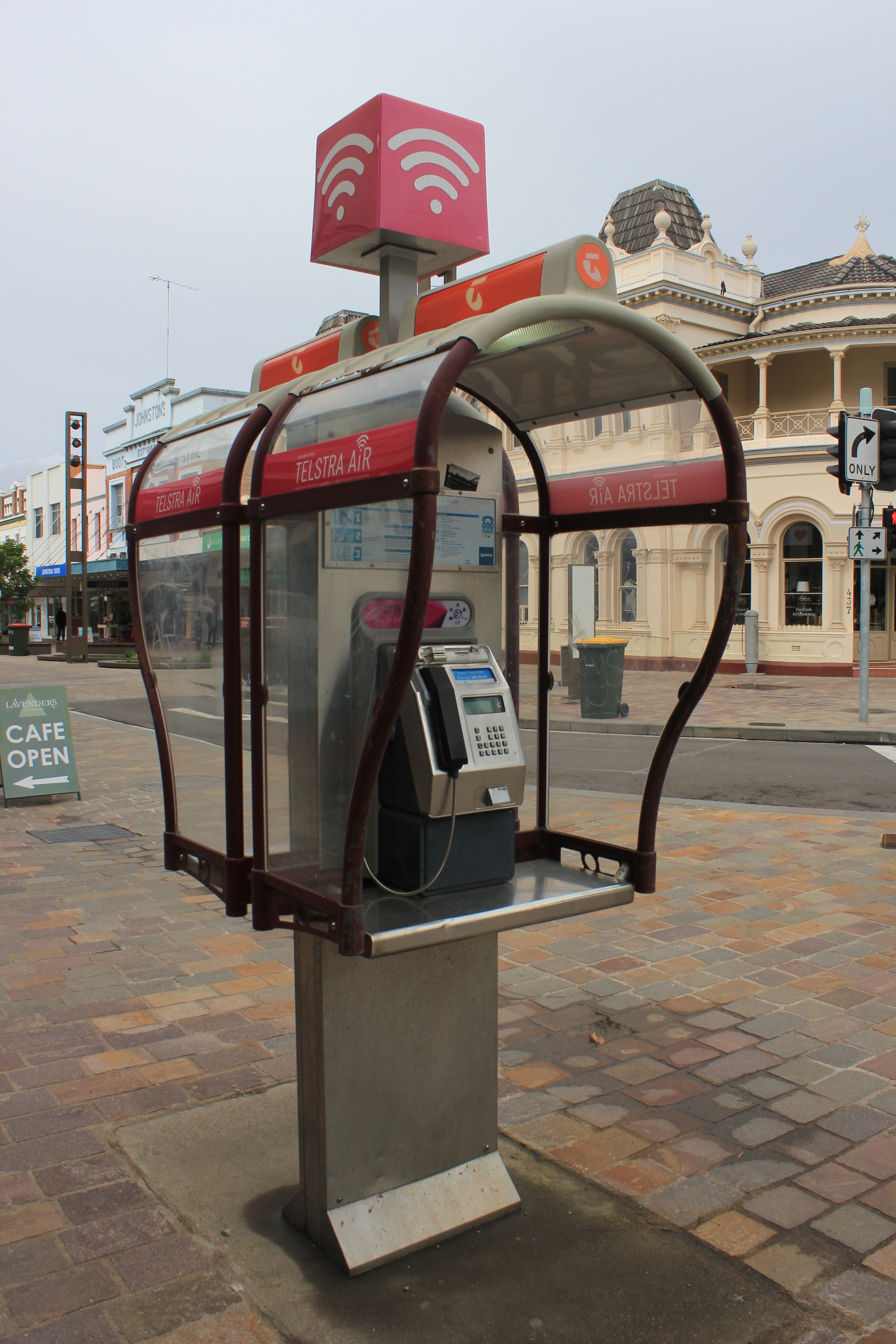
A Telstra payphone booth in Australia that also serves as a Wi-Fi hotspot to access the internet, an example of a modern pay phone that supplanted the telephone booth.

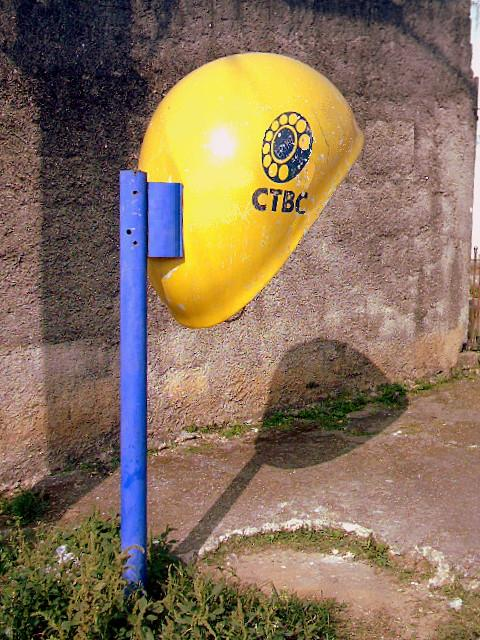
Telephone kiosk in Brazil, popularly called orelhão ("big ear") because of its shape

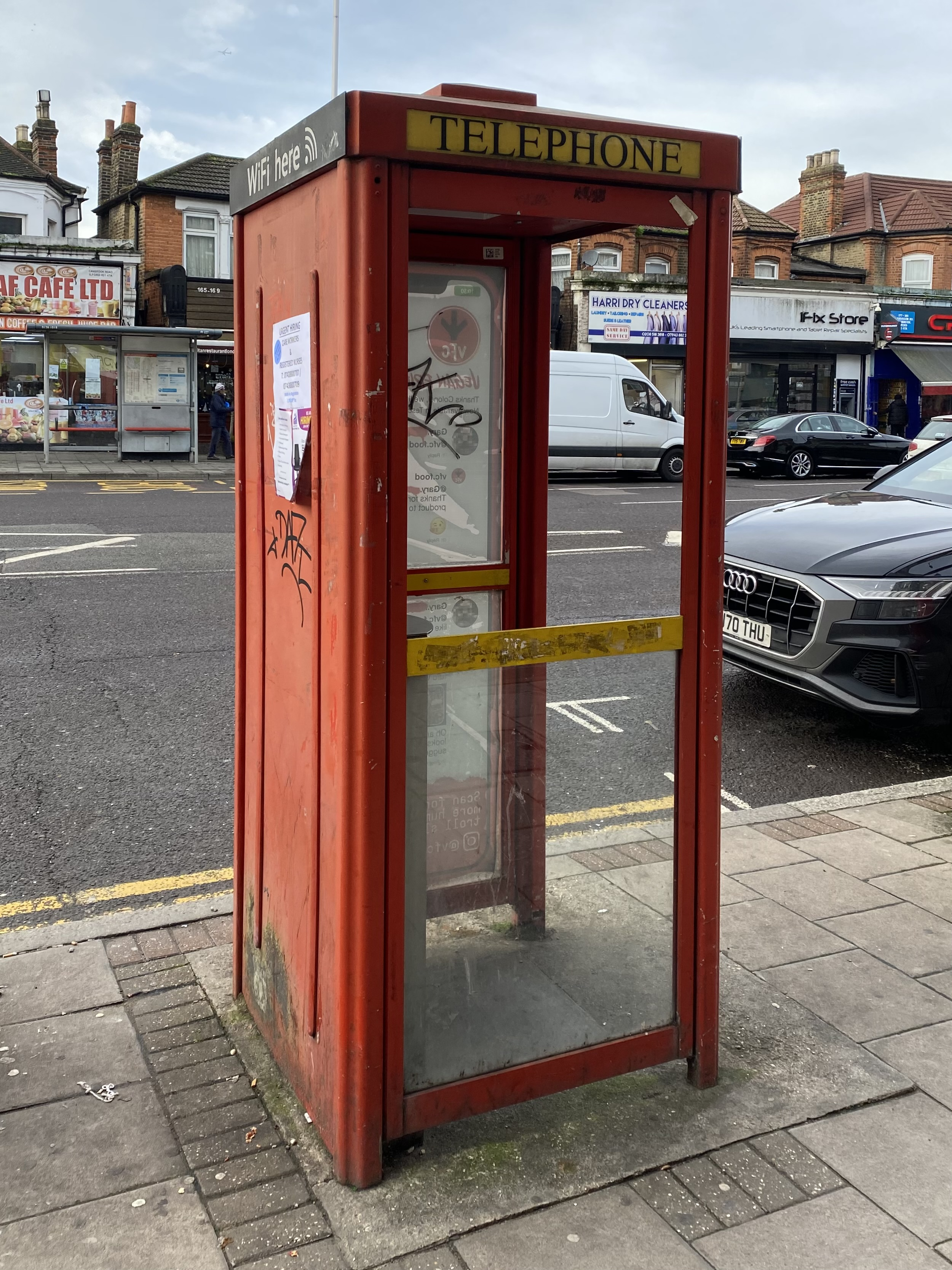
A decommissioned telephone booth in Ilford, London, 2022

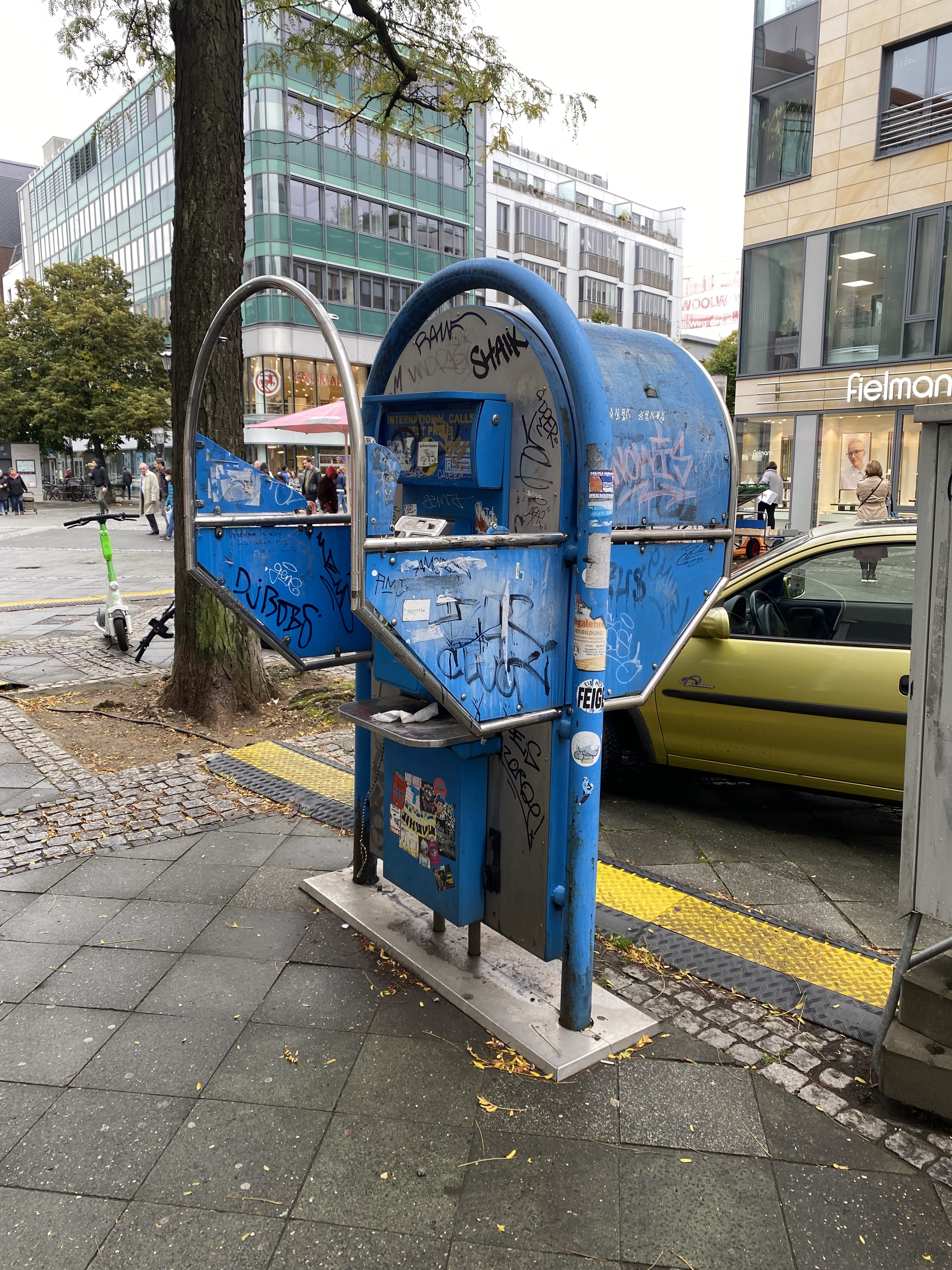
A decommissioned telephone booth in Berlin, 2022

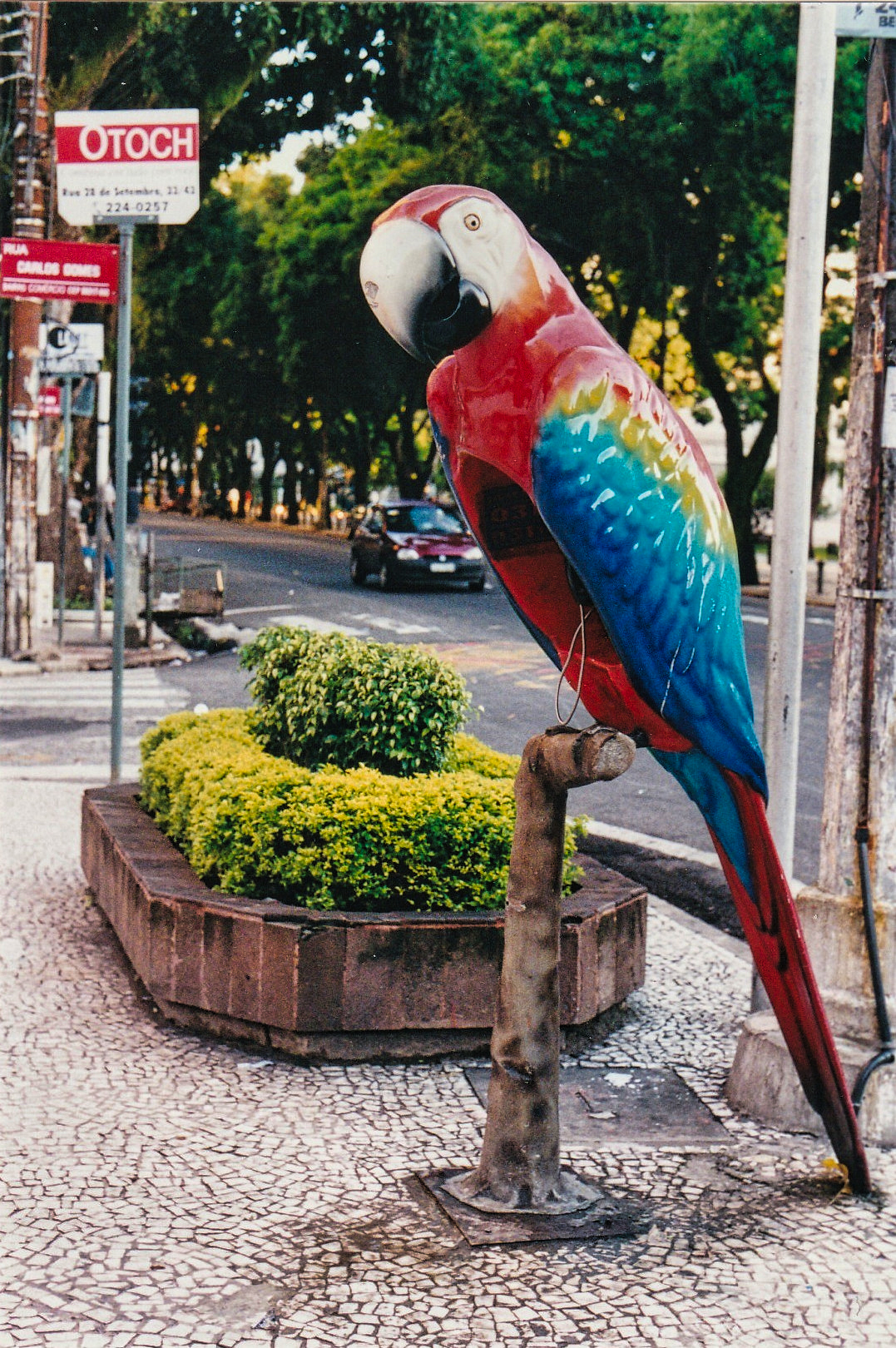
Telephone kiosk in Brazil, popularly called orelhão ("big ear") in the special form of an animal, here a parrot, in Belém, 2001

== See also ==
- Callbox
- Hotspot (Wi-Fi)
- Interactive kiosk
- KX telephone boxes
- Mojave phone booth
- Payphone
- Police box
- Red telephone box
- Orelhão, a Brazilian ear-shaped telephone booth
- Sir Giles Gilbert Scott, the English architect who designed the iconic red telephone box
- Phonebooth stuffing
