= Prairie Grove Airlight Outdoor Telephone Booth =

- U.S. National Register of Historic Places
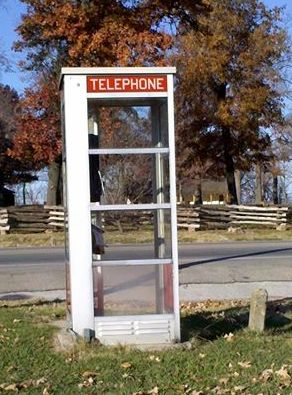
- The telephone booth, November 2012

- Location within Arkansas Location within the United States
- Location: Prairie Grove, Arkansas
- Coordinates: 35°58′57.4″N 94°18′36″W
- Built: c. 1960
- NRHP reference No.: 15000291
- Added to NRHP: November 9, 2015

The Prairie Grove Airlight Outdoor Telephone Booth is a telephone booth installed at the southwest corner of East Douglas and Parker Streets in Prairie Grove, Arkansas, United States. It is an early example of the Airlight, the first American mass-produced weather-resistant metal telephone booth, which made possible widespread installation of outdoor payphones. In 2015, it became the first phone booth on the National Register of Historic Places.

== Description and history ==
The phone booth is located on the east side of Prairie Grove, opposite the entrance to Prairie Grove Battlefield State Park on U.S. Highway 62, and in front of the Colonial Motel. It is a structure of aluminum with a satin finish, and glass window walls, with a bifold door that folds inward, topped by a red panel marked "TELEPHONE". It rests on a small concrete pad, with the door facing the highway, and measures about 86.125 inches (218.76 cm) in height, and 33.5 inches (85 cm) in width and depth at its base. It is slightly larger at the top, with an aluminum roof that projects slightly beyond the walls. The interior of the booth houses an aluminum shelf, above which the original telephone is mounted. A swiveling directory holder is mounted in the shelf, and there is a fluorescent light fixture mounted in the ceiling.

It is an Airlight Outdoor Telephone Booth, a product introduced by American Telephone & Telegraph (AT&T) in 1954 as a way to install public telephones in outdoor locations. Previously, telephones, even publicly accessible pay phones, had generally only been available indoors. This particular telephone booth was installed about 1960 by the local Prairie Grove Telephone Company, to serve visitors to the nearby motel and state park. It is the only surviving booth of the company's original four.

In 2014, the phone booth was damaged by an SUV, after which the company repaired it, replacing a few of its glass panes and straightening bent metal parts. Ralph Wilcox, director of historic preservation programs for Arkansas, believes it is one of only two telephone booths of this type in the state with a working phone.

It was added to the NRHP on November 9, 2015.

== See also ==
- Mojave phone booth
- National Register of Historic Places listings in Washington County, Arkansas
