= Mojave phone booth =

Isolated phone booth

- No. issued: +1 (760) 733-9969

Mojave phone booth
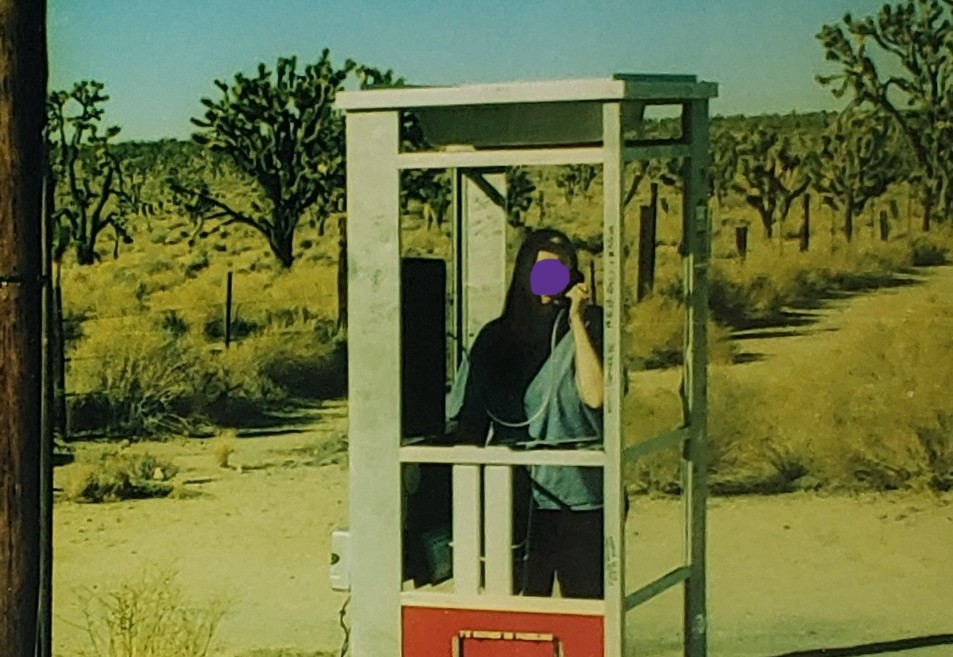
- The phone booth being used in December 1999, before its eventual removal

- Location within California

General information
- Status: Removed May 17, 2000; 26 years ago
- Type: Phone booth
- Location: Mojave National Preserve, San Bernardino County, California, United States
- Coordinates: 35.285827°N 115.68463°W
- Inaugurated: 1960s
- Owner: Pacific Bell

The Mojave phone booth (/moʊˈhɑːvi, mə-/ mo-HAH-vee) was a lone telephone booth in what is now the Mojave National Preserve in California. It attracted online attention in 1997 for its unusual location. It was located at the intersection of two dirt roads in a remote part of the Mojave Desert, 12 miles (19 km) from the nearest paved road (Interstate 15 to the northeast, Kelbaker Road to the southwest) and miles from any buildings.

== History ==
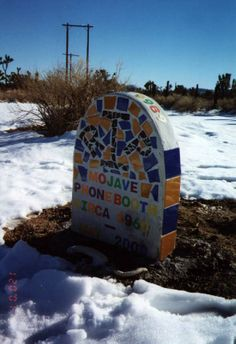
The headstone commemorating the phone booth (later removed)

The phone booth was originally set up in 1948 to provide telephone service to local volcanic cinder miners and others living in the area, at the request of Emerson Ray, who owned the Cima Cinder Mine nearby. It was assigned the name Cinder Peak Policy Station, part of a network of "policy stations" placed by mandate of the California government to serve residents of isolated parts of the state. The Mojave phone booth probably replaced an earlier booth 30 miles (48 km) to the south. The original hand-cranked magneto phone was replaced with a payphone in the 1960s. The rotary phone was then replaced with a touch-tone model in the 1970s. The booth phone's original number was BAker-3-9969. After area codes were established in 1947, it shared the same area code as all of Southern California, 213. In 1951, the area code 714 was split off from 213, and 714 was the booth's area code until 1982 when parts of Riverside and San Bernardino counties were given the area code 619. The booth's area code for its final few years of existence was 760.

In 1997, a Los Angeles man spotted a telephone icon on a map of the Mojave Desert and decided to visit it. He wrote a letter about his adventure to an underground magazine and included the booth's telephone number. An Arizona man, Godfrey Daniels, read the letter and started a website devoted to the Mojave telephone booth. The booth became an Internet sensation after it was mentioned in a New York Times article. Soon other people began calling the booth, others made websites about it, and a few even took trips to the booth to answer, often camping out at the site. Several callers kept recordings of their conversations. Over time, the booth became covered in graffiti left by visitors.

== Removal ==
The booth was removed by Pacific Bell on May 17, 2000, at the request of the National Park Service. Per Pacific Bell policy, the phone number was retired. Officially, the removal was because of visitors' environmental impact on the national preserve, and a letter by the Mojave National Preserve's superintendent mentions confronting Pacific Bell with some long-forgotten easement fees. A headstone-like plaque was later placed at the site, but it too was eventually removed by the National Park Service. Fans of the booth feared that Pacific Bell had destroyed the booth, which was confirmed by Pac-Bell spokesperson Steve Getzug.

The story inspired the creation of an independent short film, Dead Line, a short documentary, Mojave Mirage, and a full-length motion picture, Mojave Phone Booth. The booth was also an inspiration for the prologue of the Glenn Beck novel The Overton Window, and is the subject of a 99% Invisible podcast episode, "Mojave Phone Booth". In 2018, Adventures with the Mojave Phone Booth was published, a full-length book chronicling the booth's history, rise to fame, destruction, and aftermath.

== Revival of the phone number ==
AT&T's PacBell no longer owns the Baker, California +1-760-733-9XXX block of one thousand numbers, having relinquished it to competitive local exchange carrier peerlessnetwork.com on March 28, 2013, as part of a number pooling scheme. The Mojave phone booth's number, 760-733-9969, was acquired from the CLEC by phone phreak Lucky225(real name Jered Morgan) on July 31, 2013, and would ring using voice over IP to a conference he and Teli Tuketu set up, as well as a text based IRC-like chat. Callers joined a conference where strangers could once again connect just like when the phone booth was active.

== See also ==
- Prairie Grove Airlight Outdoor Telephone Booth
