= Jessie Smith =

Jessie Smith may refer to:

- Jessie Payne Margoliouth (1856–1933), née Smith, Syriac scholar
- Jessie Willcox Smith (1863–1935), American illustrator
- Jessie Evans Smith (born Jessie Ella Evans; 1902–1971), wife of Joseph Fielding Smith
- Jessie Maye Smith (1907–2005), American ornithologist
- J. L. Smith (born Jessie L. Smith), American baseball pitcher
- Jessie Carney Smith (born 1930), American librarian and educator
- Jessie Smith (singer) (1941–2021), American R&B vocalist

== See also ==
- Jessica Smith (disambiguation)
- Jesse Smith (disambiguation)
