= Jesse Smith =

Jesse Smith may refer to:

== Sports ==
- Jesse Smith (water polo) (born 1983), water polo player for the United States at the 2004 Summer Olympics
- Jesse D. Smith (born 1986), Australian rules footballer with the Carlton Football Club
- Jesse W. Smith (born 1986), former Australian rules footballer with the North Melbourne and St Kilda Football Clubs
- Jesse Smith (racing driver) (born 1989), American racing driver

== Music ==
- Jesse Smith, daughter of Patti Smith
- Jesse Smith (musician), drummer for Christian metalcore band Zao

== Others ==
- Jess Smith (Jesse W. Smith, 1871–1923), American political functionary
- Jesse C. Smith (1808–1888), New York lawyer and politician, Union Army general
- Jesse N. Smith (1834–1906), pioneer of the Mormon religion
- Jesse Merrick Smith (1848–1927), American mechanical engineer

== See also ==
- Jessie Smith (disambiguation)
- Jessica Smith (disambiguation)
- Jesse Smyth, character in the 2006 film Kenny
