= Calculagraph =

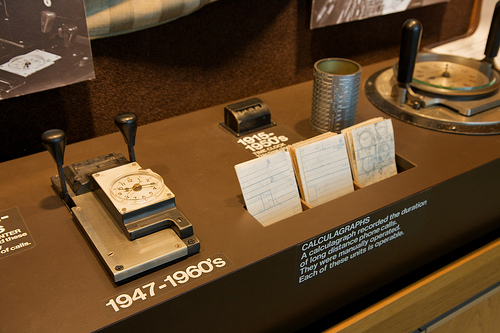
A museum exhibit of Calculagraphs

The Calculagraph is a device which mechanically calculates and prints the elapsed time between two events. Their best known, earliest use was as a means of tracking table usage in pool halls. Later, until the advent of the digital era, they became the standard way to clock the duration of toll telephone calls.

== Invention ==
Henry Abbott, a watchmaker, invented the Calculagraph, and he made a career out of modifying and improving upon the original design. He obtained many patents; the first one specifically using the name Calculagraph was No. 583320, issued May 25, 1897. The characteristic aspect of the machine's design is its automatic performance of elapsed-time calculations, as calculating the difference between two times manually is a tedious and error-prone process, and the machines quickly gained popularity.

Abbott founded the Calculagraph Company in New York City, and later moved to New Jersey. The company is still in business, now known as Control Products, Inc.; however they no longer manufacture the product.

== Design ==
The unit consists of a clock and a precision gear-based set of three printing wheels, which print on standardized accounting tickets. One of the wheels presents a clock face, and indicates the time at which a measured interval commenced. It is printed by pushing forward on the right handle. Pulling back on that same handle prints a pair of hollow dial faces with quantities printed around the outside. The ticket is then removed and set aside until the completion event occurs. The ticket is then re-inserted into the Calculagraph, and the left handle is pulled back. This prints a pair of arrow indicators in the center of each previously printed dial, pointing at the elapsed time since the original event. The center of each arrow contains a legend.

Models 6 and 110 were based on the original design, and a complete re-design led to the Model 33. The original clocks were wind-up, using the popular Seth Thomas #10 movement. Electric models included 110 V and 20 V versions.

Different versions were used as employee time clocks, for professional billing, job cost accounting, room and equipment rental, and many other applications. They could be configured to print in various time formats, such as minutes and seconds, minutes and tenths, or hours and minutes. The pool hall versions printed in dollars and cents. Others printed the date along with the start time.
