= William Gray (inventor) =

American inventor, creator of the payphone

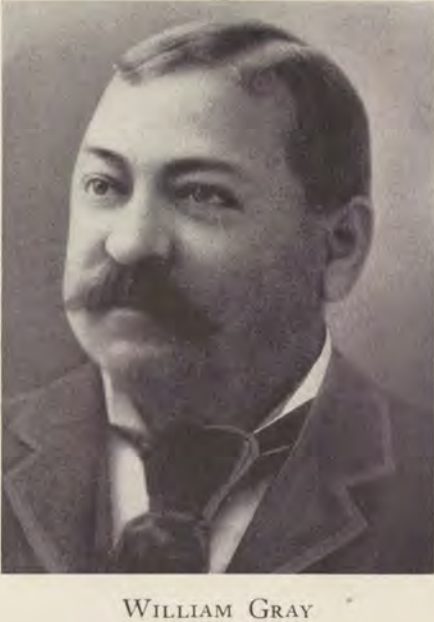
- Born: December 1850; Tariffville, Connecticut, U.S.
- Died: January 24, 1903 (aged 52); Hartford, Connecticut, U.S.
- Occupations: Inventor, entrepreneur

William Gray (1850 – January 24, 1903) was an American inventor and entrepreneur. He is best known for inventing the coin-operated payphone and an improved chest protector for baseball catchers. He founded the highly successful Gray Telephone Pay Station Company, which became one of the largest employers in the Hartford, Connecticut, area.

== Early life and employment ==
William Gray was born in Tariffville, Connecticut, in December 1850 to Scottish immigrants Neil and Mary Gray. When Gray was young, his family relocated to Boston.

His father found a job for him at a local drug store, but the druggist found he preferred tinkering to working, so he was placed in a machine shop. He moved to Hartford and found employment as a polisher in an armory, where he proved to be a good worker. He then worked for Pratt & Whitney, where he rose to head of the polishing department, a position he occupied for 15 years.

== Inventing ==
=== Manufacturing ===
Gray tried to improve the manufacturing process, so he made a new belt shifter, patented his invention (Device for throwing belts onto or off from revolving pulleys, US patent no. 248,587, dated October 25, 1881) and sold it to Pratt & Whitney.

=== Baseball ===
A baseball fan, he came up with a couple of inventions for the sport. First came the sand-handle baseball bat (Base Ball Bat, US patent no. 300,360, dated June 7, 1884), which was sold to A. G. Spaulding's sporting goods company. It did not catch on.

However, his next invention proved to be more successful. Chest protectors had been invented in the early 1880s. Deacon White may have created the first. According to legend, the wife of Charlie Bennett, a Major League Baseball catcher, devised a chest protector which he began wearing openly (as opposed to under his uniform) in 1883. However, Gray came up with an improved padded protector that shielded the catcher's entire chest and groin area without restricting their movement very much (Body Protector, US patent no. 374,150, dated November 29, 1887). He again sold his patent to Spaulding, which advertised "Gray's Patent Body Protector" in its annual Official Base Ball Guide. This became standard baseball equipment in the 1890s.

=== The payphone ===
Supposedly, Gray was inspired to create a payphone when no one would let him use their phone to call a doctor for his wife. Gray did eventually find a phone and his wife recovered, but right after the incident he was determined to create phones, available for everyone. A few payphone booths had been installed prior to his work, but with attendants to collect payment for their use. Gray did away with the need for the latter. His first payphone accepted coins and moved a cover upon payment, making the call possible (Coin Controlled Apparatus for Telephones, US Patent No. 408,709, dated August 13, 1889). Gray improved his invention, when he made a signal device for telephone pay stations. In total, he obtained over 20 patents to improve the payphone.

==== The Gray Telephone Pay Station Company ====
In 1891, he founded the Gray Telephone Pay Station Company to install payphones across the United States. It was extremely successful and even weathered the 1929 Great Depression without problem. Eventually, however, Gray's patents expired and it was bought out by another company.

== Death ==
On January 19, 1903, Gray suffered a stroke, dying five days later. He was survived by a wife and four children.
