= Jessica Smyth =

Jessica Smyth may refer to:

- Biig Piig (born 1998), Irish musician
- Jessica Duncan Piazzi Smyth (1812–1896), Scottish geologist

== See also ==
- Jessica Smith (disambiguation)
