= Jessica Smith =

Jessica Smith may refer to:

- Jessica Smith (editor) (1895–1983), American activist and editor
- Jessica Smith (speed skater) (born 1983), Olympic short track speed skater from the United States
- Jessica Smith (runner) (born 1989), Canadian track and field athlete
- Jessica Smith (swimmer), Australian Paralympic swimmer
- Jessica Smith (actress) (born 1995), portrayed the "Sun Baby" in Teletubbies
- Jessica Smith (curler) (born 1997), New Zealand curler
- Jessica Grace Smith (born 1988), New Zealand actress
- Jessica Smith, American contestant of Survivor: Cook Island

== See also ==
- Jessie Smith (disambiguation)
- Jesse Smith (disambiguation)
- Jessica Smyth (disambiguation)
