= Jesse Merrick Smith =

American mechanical engineer, consulting engineer and patent expert

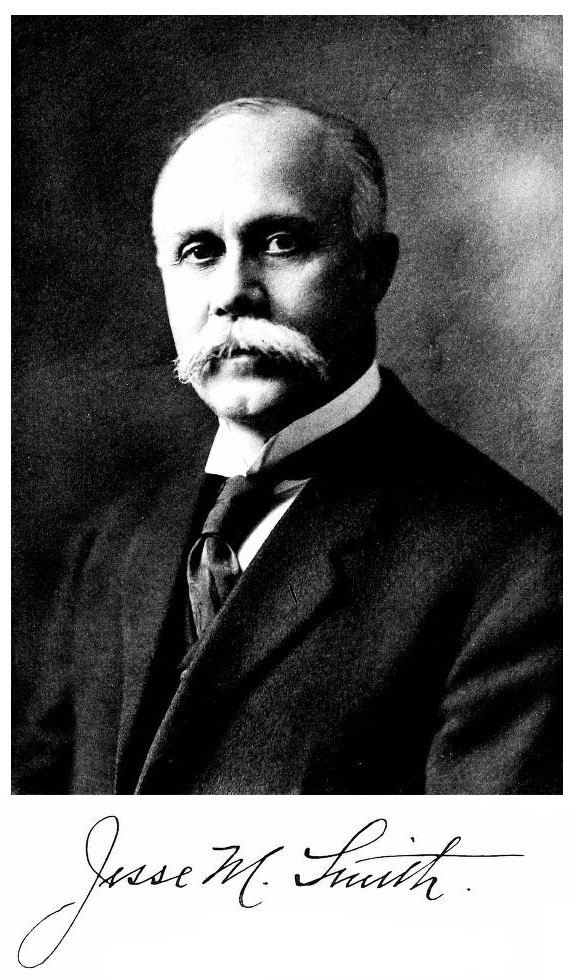
Jesse Merrick Smith

Jesse Merrick Smith (October 30, 1848 – April 1, 1927) was a prominent American mechanical engineer, consulting engineer, patent expert, and president of the American Society of Mechanical Engineers in the year 1909-10.

== Biography ==
=== Youth and education ===
Smith was born Newark, Ohio, in 1848, the son of Henry and Lucinda Salisbury Smith. In 1862 the family moved to Detroit, Michigan, where he attended Philo Patterson's School. After attended the Rensselaer Polytechnic Institute at Troy, New York from 1865 to 1868, he continued his studies in Europe.

After a year of travel, Smith entered the Ecole Centrale des Arts et Manufactures in Paris in 1869, where he obtained the degree of Mechanical Engineer in 1872. After graduation he continued travelling through France, Belgium and Germany, visiting manufacturing plants along the way and attending lectures at the Technische Hochschule in Charlottenburg (now Technische Universität Berlin). From there he went to England spending another three months visiting iron and machine works.

=== Early career ===
After returning to the States in 1973, he settled in Hocking County, Ohio and began the practice of engineering. He designed blast furnaces at the coal mines for smelting iron from native ores, and superintending the construction. In 1880 he moved to Detroit, Michigan where he started his own consulting engineering office. He designed both special machinery such as high-speed steam engine, as well as manufacturing and power plants, and overall design of manufacturing establishments.

Smith specifically developed the design of a "high-speed steam engine, with shaft governor, using the inertia principle... put into operation in connection with a Brush dynamo, operating 40 arc lights." As representative of a Michigan electrical lighting company, he installed electrical installation. Among others he supplied the SM Stillman Hotel, Cleveland, Ohio with an electric light plant, and 1,000 lights, making that hotel first in the United States lighted exclusively and continuously by electricity.

=== Later career ===
Since 1883 Smith had gotten engaged as expert witness in patent infringements cases at the United States courts, and over the years became an expert in a number of important suits. In 1898 he moved to New York starting a consulting engineering office, exclusively devoted to patent expert work.

The Cassier's Magazine (1909) recalled, that Smith acted on cases, such as "steam injectors, under the Hancock Inspirator patents; cylinder lubricators for locomotives; roller mills and middlings-purifiers for flour manufacture; cyclone dust collectors; quick-action air-brakes under the Westinghouse patents; pneumatic tires for automobiles; automobiles under the Selden patent; induction electric motors under the Tesla patents; pressure filters; incandescent electric lamps: steam-heating apparatus: typewriters; rein forced-concrete construction; the calculagraph, etc."

Smith was member of the American Society of Mechanical Engineers since in 1883; the American Institute of Electrical Engineers; the American Institute of Mining and Metallurgical Engineers; the Société des ingénieurs civils de France; the Association amicale des anciens élèves de l'Ecole centrale des arts et manufactures; of the Engineering Society of Detroit; the American Association for the Advancement of Science; the American Geographical Society, the Engineers' Club of New York, and the Ohio Society of New York. He was president of the American Society of Mechanical Engineers in the year 1909-10.

In 1927 Smith died at home in New York City.

== Publications ==
Jesse M. Smith. "The Profession of Engineering," in: Transactions of the American Society of Mechanical Engineers, New York City : The Society. Vol 31, 1909, p. 429-436

Patents, a selection

- Patents US-282789, Governor for steam-engines, 1883
- Patent US-301764, Fast and loose pulley device, 1884
- Patent US-198820 A, Improvement in hot-blast ovens, 1887

Publications about Jesse Merrick Smith

- Jesse Merrick Smith, Cassier's Magazine. Vol 35, 1909. p. 356
- American Society of Mechanical Engineers. "Jesse Merrick Smith," Transactions of the American Society of Mechanical Engineers, New York City : The Society. Vol 31, 1909, p. 3-4
