= Payphone =

Coin or card-operated public telephone

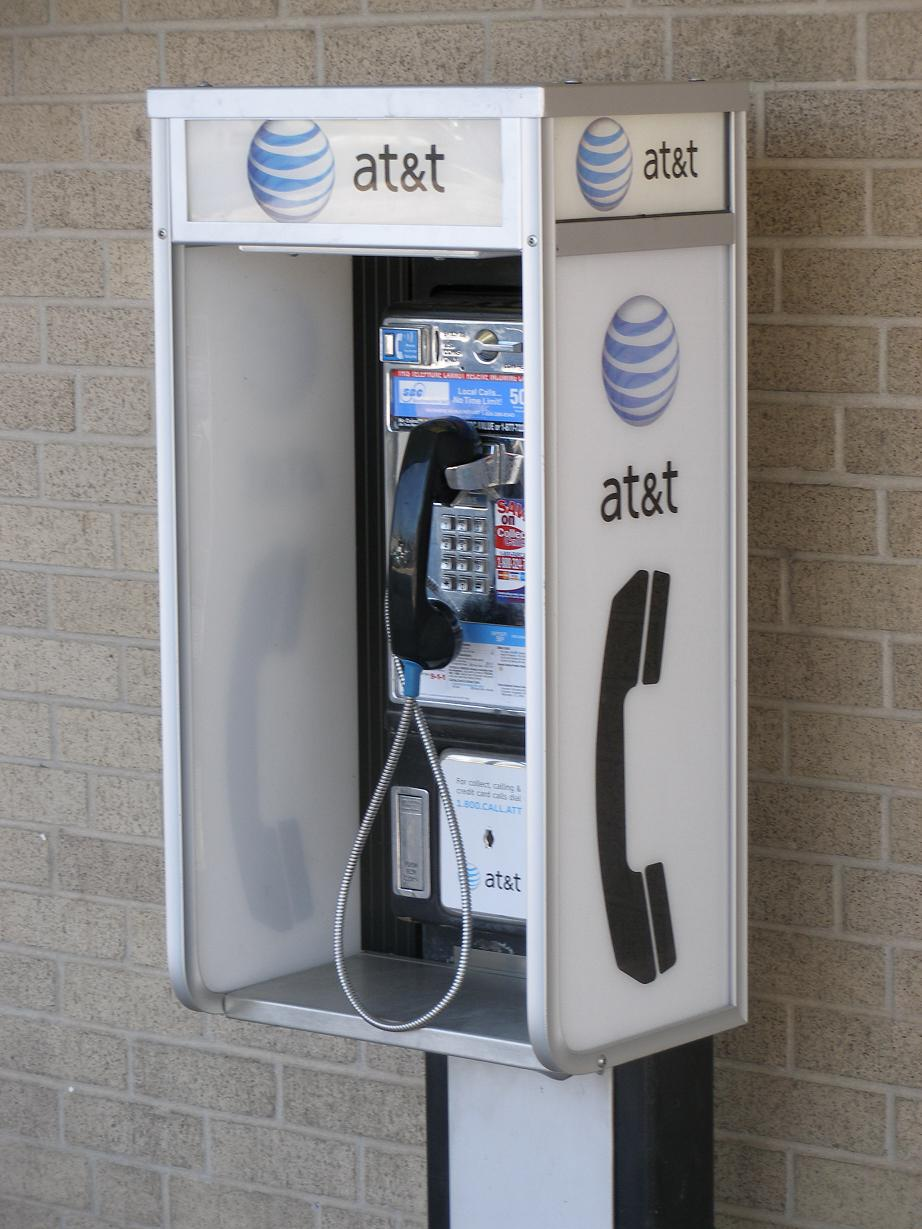
AT&T payphone in San Antonio, Texas in 2006

A payphone (alternative spelling: pay phone or pay telephone or public phone) is typically a coin-operated public telephone, often located in a telephone booth or in high-traffic public areas. Prepayment is required by inserting coins or telephone tokens, swiping a credit or debit card, or using a telephone card.

The company that operates the payphone generally pays either rent or a revenue share to the owner of the property where the phone is installed.

Invented in the late 19th century, payphones became ubiquitous worldwide in the 20th, enough to contribute to the notion of universal access to basic communication services. The charge for a call may be a flat rate, or dependent on call duration. Following the explosive growth of mobile telephony, the use of payphones, and the number installed, has decreased greatly; several countries and areas have now abolished their payphone services altogether.

== Countries ==
=== Australia ===
As of 2017, in Australia, there are approximately 17,000 payphones. Previously, there had been over 30,000 payphones.

In Australia, Telstra operates 15,000 payphones, which have been available free of charge as of 2021. Telstra had previously made payphones available for free at Christmas and the New Year. The number of payphones Telstra operates is determined by the Australian federal government.

Telstra has a universal service contract to provide payphones, which was criticized by ABC News for failing to secure mobile phones in February 2024 after a severe storm destroyed houses and shut down power and communications in Mirboo North.

In 2017, the Australian government considered abolishing the payphone network.

=== Canada ===
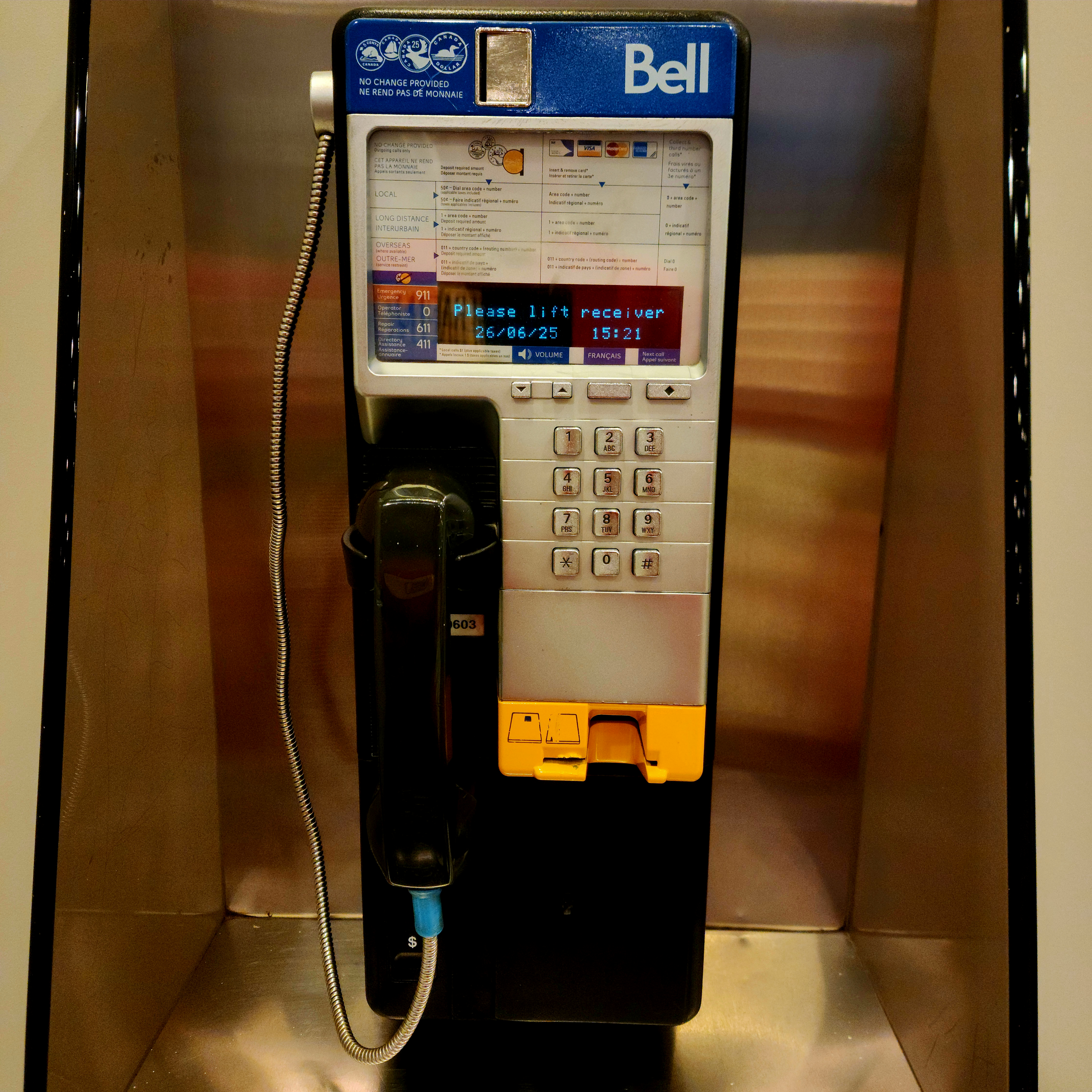
Bell Canada payphone in Toronto

Most payphones in Canada are owned and operated by large telecom providers such as Bell, Telus Communications, and SaskTel. In the last 20 years, customer-owned coin-operated telephones (COCOT) have also appeared in the market, but their numbers are smaller due to the emergence of mobile phones.

The cost of most local payphone calls is 50 cents CAD, having increased from 25 cents since 2007. Payphones in Alberta were 35 cents for a time, but in most jurisdictions the price simply doubled. Newer phones allow users to use calling cards and credit cards. For coin-paid long distance, COCOTs are less expensive for short calls (typically $1 for three minutes) than incumbent providers (whose rates start near $5 for the first minute).

Dialing 0 for the operator and 911 calls are still free.

The Toronto Transit Commission deploys payphones on all subway platforms as a safety precaution; a blue "Crisis Link" button on 141 payphones connects directly with Distress Centres of Canada as a free suicide prevention measure.

As of 2013, there were about 70,000 payphones across the country.

In 2013, the CRTC issued a temporary moratorium on the removal of payphones in small communities.

In September 2015, the CRTC remarked that "32 percent of Canadians used a payphone at least once in the past year," and that they are used "as a last resort in times of inconvenience and emergency."

=== Germany ===
The payphone model 23, introduced at Deutsche Bundespost Telekom in 1992, is an electronic software-controlled payphone for analog connections. It is equipped with coin, (German: Münzspeicherwagen), and integrated test program setting. It has a remote maintenance – the independent reports of a background system by means of an integrated modem error (for example, defects in components, lack of listeners), operating states (for example, full coin box), or departures (for example standing open the cartridge mounting door, missing coin).

The Payphone 23 consists of two basic units, the equipment part including all the necessary for the operation modules (BG) and the secured below the growing payphone cassettes with the coin box.

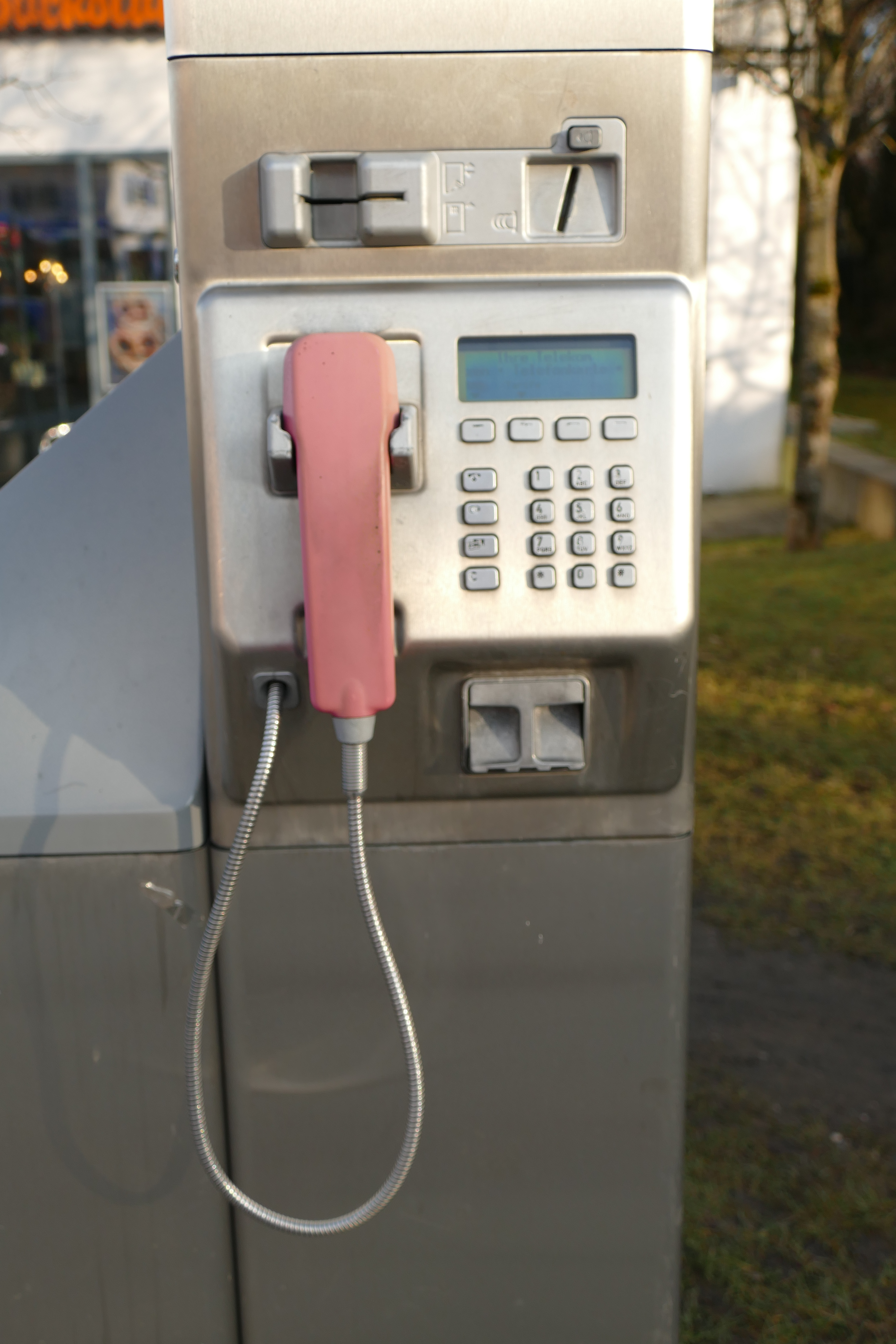
Payphone in Munich, 2022

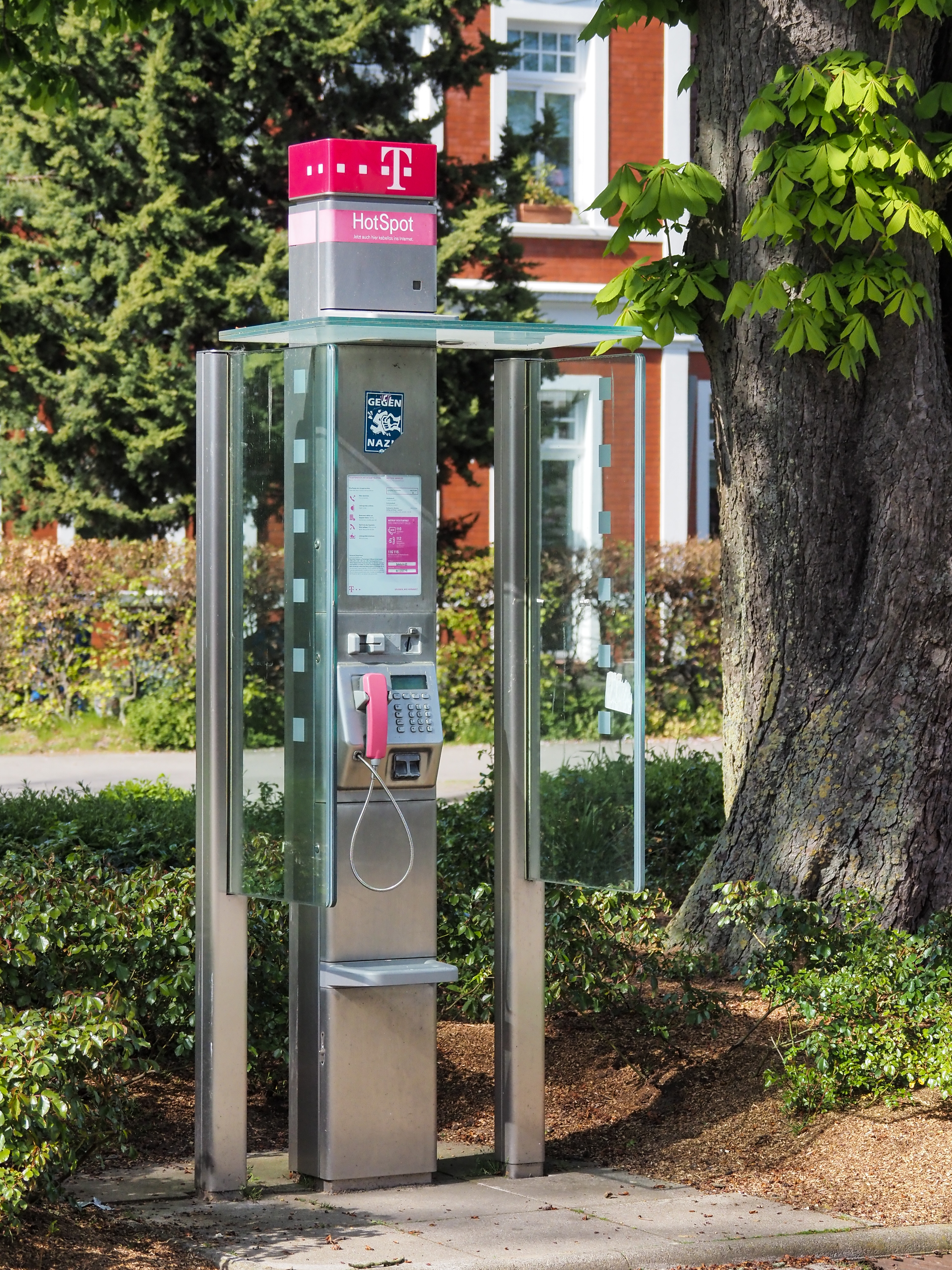
Payphone at Cloppenburg station

=== Hong Kong ===
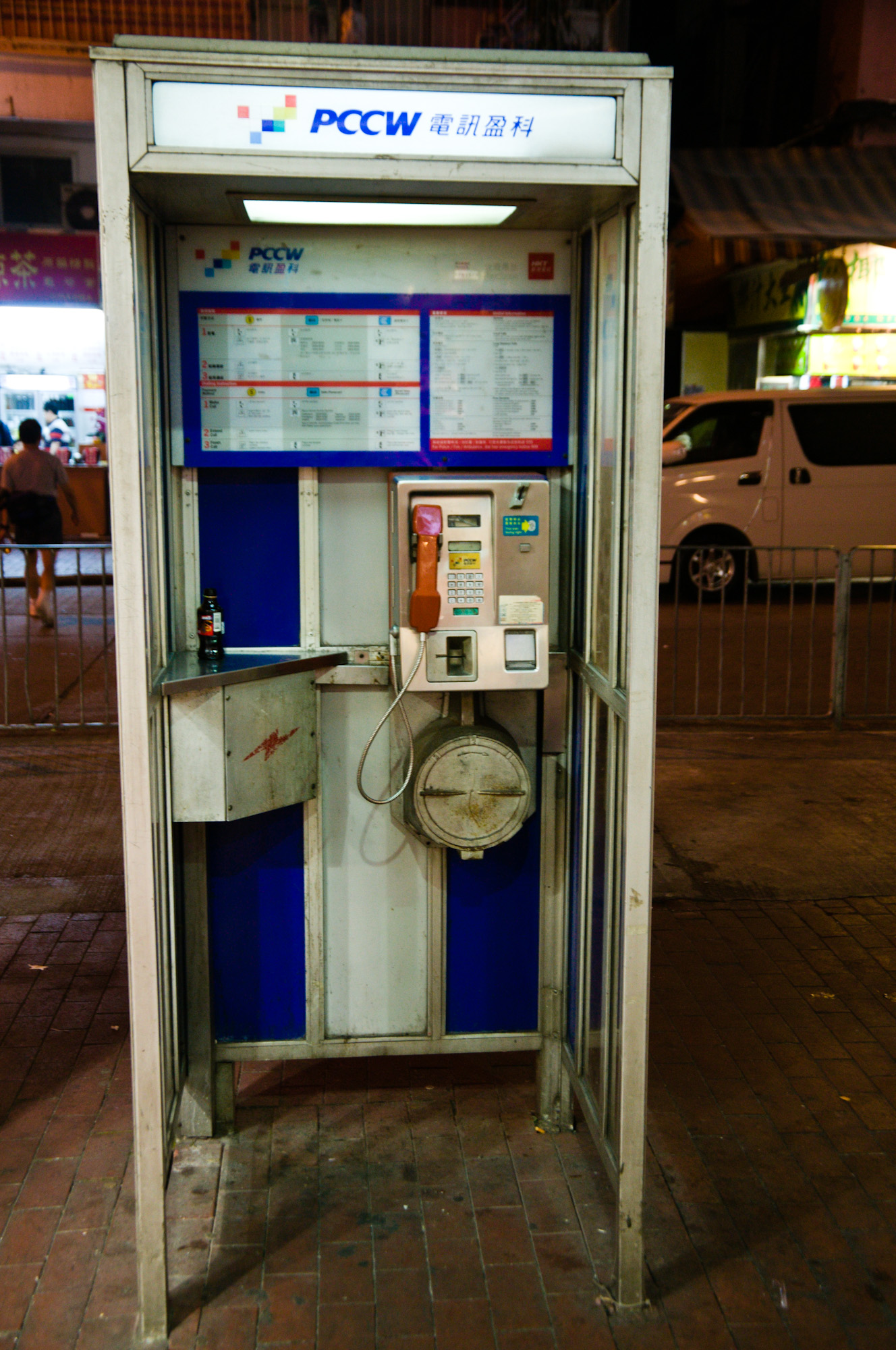
PCCW Payphone on April 4, 2012

In Hong Kong, public payphones have been installed and maintained over the years primarily by HKT (formerly PCCW).

Many public telephones were removed throughout the 2010s and early 2020s due to low usage, but thousands of physical kiosks still remain across the territory.

Following structural changes in the telecommunications market and a decision by the Office of the Communications Authority (OFCA) to reduce subsidies, operators are no longer obligated to maintain public telephones in areas with low demand. However, the provision of communication services remains highly visible in specific public infrastructure, with free courtesy phones consistently maintained throughout the Hong Kong International Airport.

=== Italy ===
In Italy, public payphones have been installed and maintained over the years by Telecom Italia (formerly SIP).

Many public telephones were removed in the early 2010s, but there are still several thousand in operation throughout Italy.

From 26 May 2023, following an AGCOM decision, TIM-Telecom Italia is no longer obliged to keep public telephones in service (but still has the option to do so). In hospitals, prisons, barracks and mountain refuges, the provision of public telephone services is in any case mandatory.

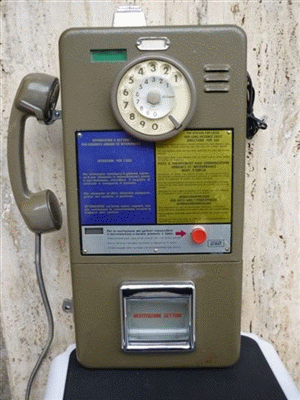
Payphone model U+I from 1964 to 1982

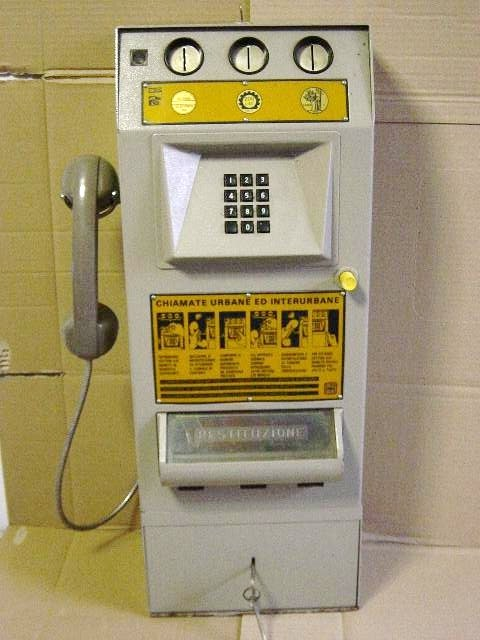
Payphone model G+M from 1982 to 1987

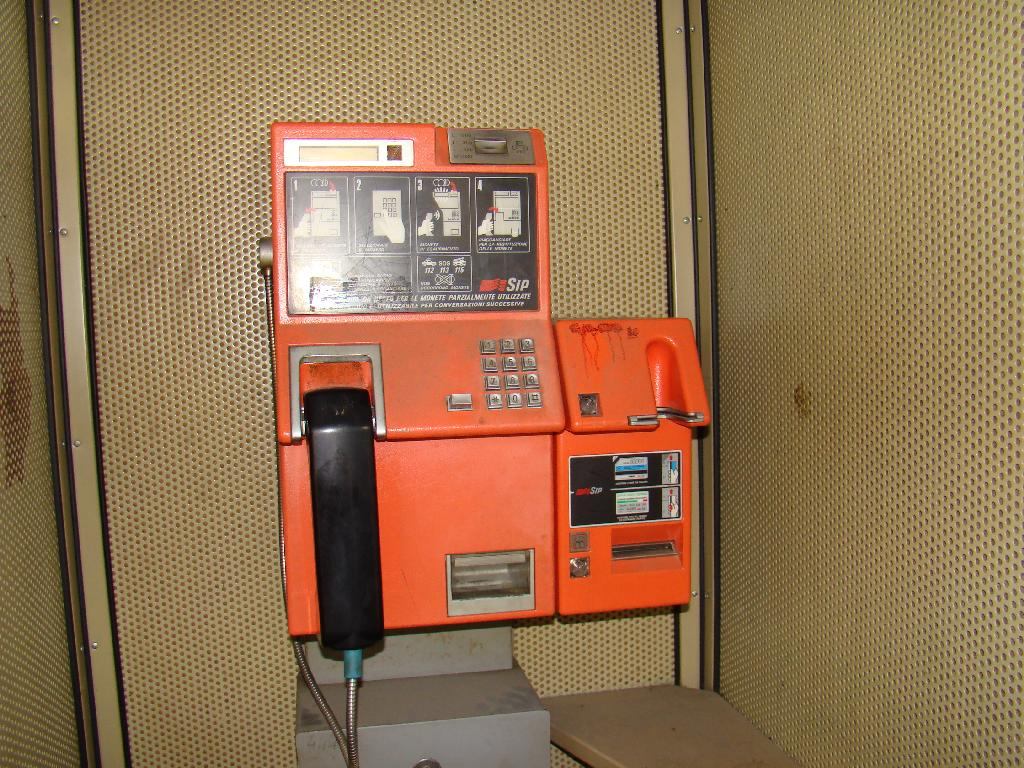
Payphone model Rotor from 1987 to 2002

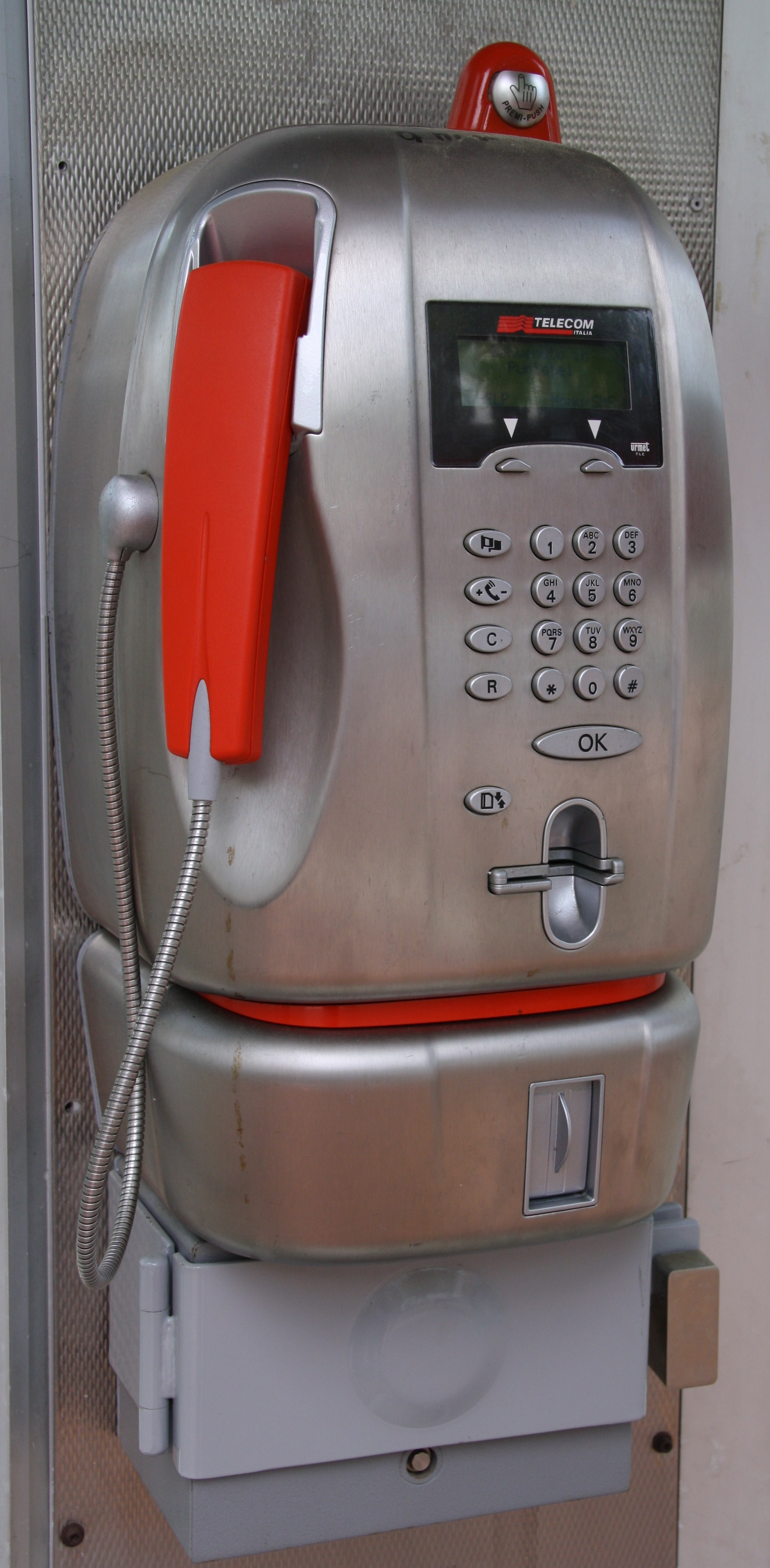
Payphone model Digito since 2002

=== Japan ===
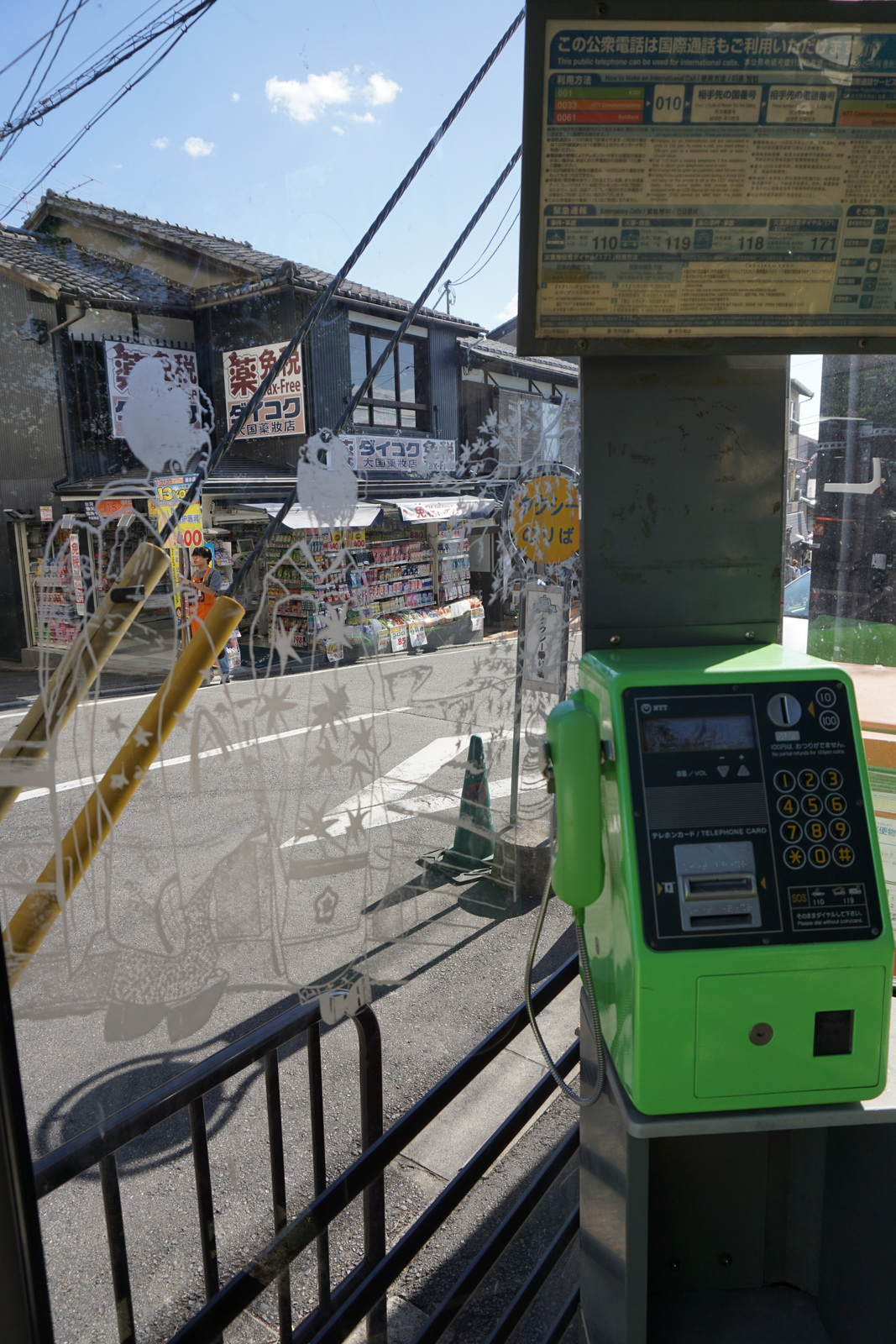
Payphone booth in Kyoto, Japan, with figures etched into the glass

The majority of payphones on the street and in buildings in Japan are installed and maintained by Nippon Telegraph and Telephone (NTT).

=== Russia ===
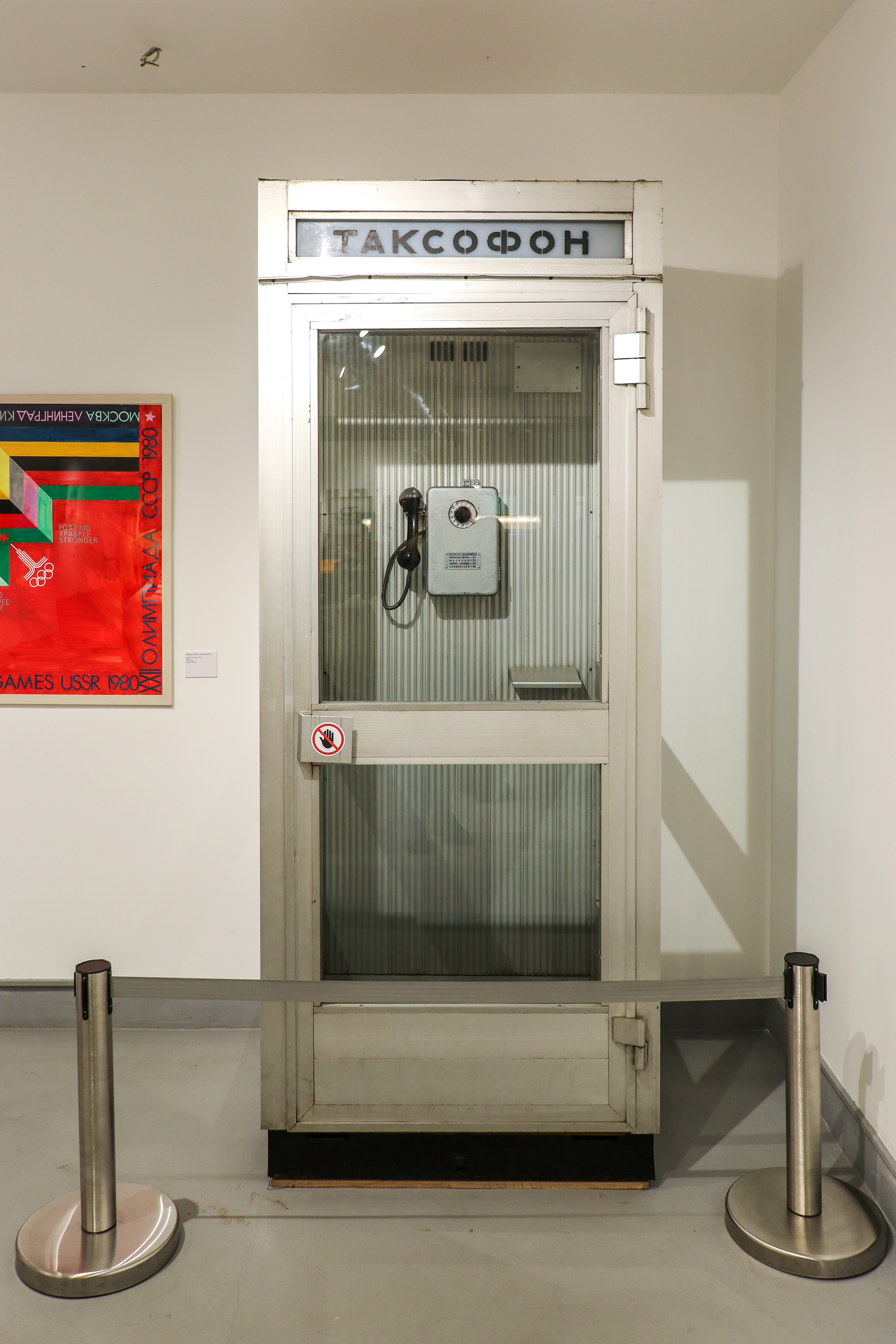
Soviet payphone

In the Soviet period, different types of payphones were produced. There were also long-distance call payphones costing 15 kopeks, and also provided services of paid media such as listening to an anecdote, obtaining legal advice, or finding the address of the subscriber by phone number. After the collapse of the Soviet Union and the monetary reform of 1991, this form of payment became irrelevant. Some payphones were altered to accept tokens, while others have been designed to use telephone cards. For example, in St Petersburg, payment for payphones can be made with metro tokens. In some regions, calls from public phones are free of charge.

=== Spain ===
Telephones were a monopoly of the national government in Spain. Payphones took a ficha (token), a piece of metal with two troughs in it, making it hard to counterfeit. Payphones were typically found in bars, restaurants, and stores, never freestanding. Phones would accept some five fichas at a time (the exact number varied depending on phone model), showing through a plastic window the number remaining, and return unused ones to the customer.

An older and simpler system was to use a mechanical counter, the marcador de pasos, which automatically counted units of time called pasos. The duration of each paso depended on the distance of the call, and its cost could vary by time of day. At the conclusion of a call a human attendant would collect the appropriate payment. This system survived in small hotels at least until the 1970s. Spain also had locutorios ("speaking places"), where a person could make and pay an attendant for phone calls. Locutorios diminished in the 21st century, as the country moved to direct distance dialing and mobile phones.

=== United Kingdom ===
The telephone service in Britain was run by the General Post Office (GPO), a state monopoly, which had taken over the National Telephone Company in 1912. Coin-operated payphones in Britain in about 1950 cost 2d (2 old pence) for a local call of unlimited duration. This eventually increased, and by about 1960 calls were timed, costing 3d for 3 minutes. Long-distance calls, connected by an operator, cost more. Telephones had a coin slot and two buttons, marked A and B. One or more coins had to be inserted and the number dialled. If answered, the call was enabled by pressing button A; if not answered, button B returned the coins. Payphones later changed and the old A/B button design was dropped; prices changed over time.

The telephone system was privatised in 1984, operated by British Telecom, still a monopoly. Phone cards were introduced for paying for calls. Payphones were later deregulated, no longer a BT monopoly. The great majority of them are still operated by British Telecom (BT) but other companies provide services, mostly in urban areas. Hull, Manchester, London, Cardiff and Glasgow, at the turn of the 21st century, have a greater concentration of non-BT payphones, since BT has been removing many payphones which are unprofitable. The use of payphones declined greatly in Britain, as everywhere, with the explosive growth of mobile telephones.

Kiosk adoption

BT allows local communities to adopt the iconic Red K6 Kiosks due to strong opposition to their removal from the communities that the kiosks reside in. This will mean the removal of the phone, leaving the empty kiosk in-situ. Adopted kiosks are often repurposed as libraries, defibrillators, information kiosks or other uses.

Sponsored kiosk

Another option BT has provided is the sponsored kiosk, that will retain the phone service, and retain the kiosk for an annual fee of around £300 excluding VAT, whether it is the Red K6 or the newer aluminium and glass kiosks that cannot be adopted.

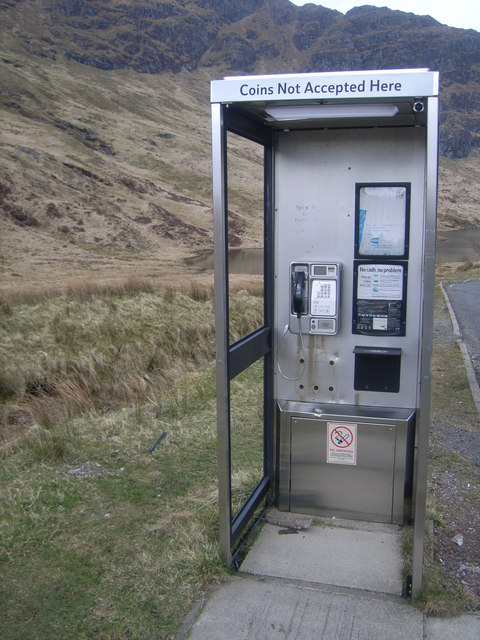
A typical BT payphone in Scotland

Payphone types

Due to disability discrimination law, specifically the Disability Discrimination Act 1995, in the past payphone providers were required to provide a certain number of textphone payphones as part of their network, as this was deemed a "reasonable adjustment" for deaf customers. These phones can also make voice calls, as well as send SMS and e-mail messages, and although this requirement is no longer in force due to minimal use of the textphone feature in these phones, many of these devices remain in service, generally in populated areas.

In addition, in the early 2000s BT installed a large number of 'Multiphones' that provided internet access, on top of voice, SMS, and e-mail functionality. These payphones provided these services through the use of a 2-channel ISDN2 connection, a QNX-based operating system, and a touchscreen interface to allow the user to browse websites and receive e-mail messages on a pay-per-minute basis. However, these devices have since been removed due to quickly becoming obsolete, often with the ordinary payphone previously installed in that location taking its place once again.

Cost

From 1 June 2010, BT payphones have a £0.60 minimum charge which is for the first 30 minutes of any direct-dialled national geographic call. Previously the minimum charge was £0.40 for the first 20 minutes of any direct-dialled national geographic call. Then before November 2006 the minimum charge was £0.30, before 2004 it was £0.20 and before 2000 it was £0.10. Credit/debit cards can also be used, and many BT payphones have card readers for this service; however, calls made using a card are charged at a significantly higher rate than calls made using cash.

BT Phonecards purchased from participating retailers were introduced in 1981, and could be used in most BT payphones to pay for calls. Cards originally used an optical system to register credit, changed to a chip-based system in the 1990s, and were withdrawn in 2003.

In the past, a BT Chargecard could be used from any UK landline to charge any telephone calls made to the cardholder's BT home telephone account, with no charge to the landline the card was being used from. These were most commonly used in payphones, and some BT payphones had dedicated readers for these cards. This service was discontinued in 2018. Other cards which are often used instead include supermarket international calling cards and many other telephone cards which can be bought from newsagents.

Although 0800 and 0808 numbers are free to the caller when dialled from most payphones, the owner of the number called must pay a 'Payphone Access Charge' (PAC) which has increased significantly in recent years, and is currently £0.79 per minute if their number is called from a payphone. This has led to many businesses, and even calling card providers, barring calls to their freephone numbers originating from payphones. Charity helplines are exempt from this charge if called from a BT payphone, however this exemption does not apply to calls made from payphones owned by other providers, and in these cases the charity must pay the PAC.

Cost examples (from BT coin-operated payphones)

There is a £0.40 connection charge, in addition to the "per minute" charges shown below, and a minimum charge of £0.60. Some payphones also offer SMS and e-mail service, both charged at £0.20 per message.

Call prefix	Type of call	Seconds per £0.10 block	Cost per minute
0800/0808/116	Freephone	Free to caller	Free to caller
01/02/03	Landline (local/national)	900	£0.0067
07 (most)	Mobile	9.5	£0.63
070/076	PNS/Pagers	3	£2.00
0845	Non-geographic ('Special Services') – 'Lo-Call'	30	£0.20
0870	Non-geographic ('Special Services') – 'National'	12	£0.50
09	Premium-rate services ('PRS')	1.5	£4.00
123	Speaking clock ('Timeline')	5	£1.20

=== United States ===
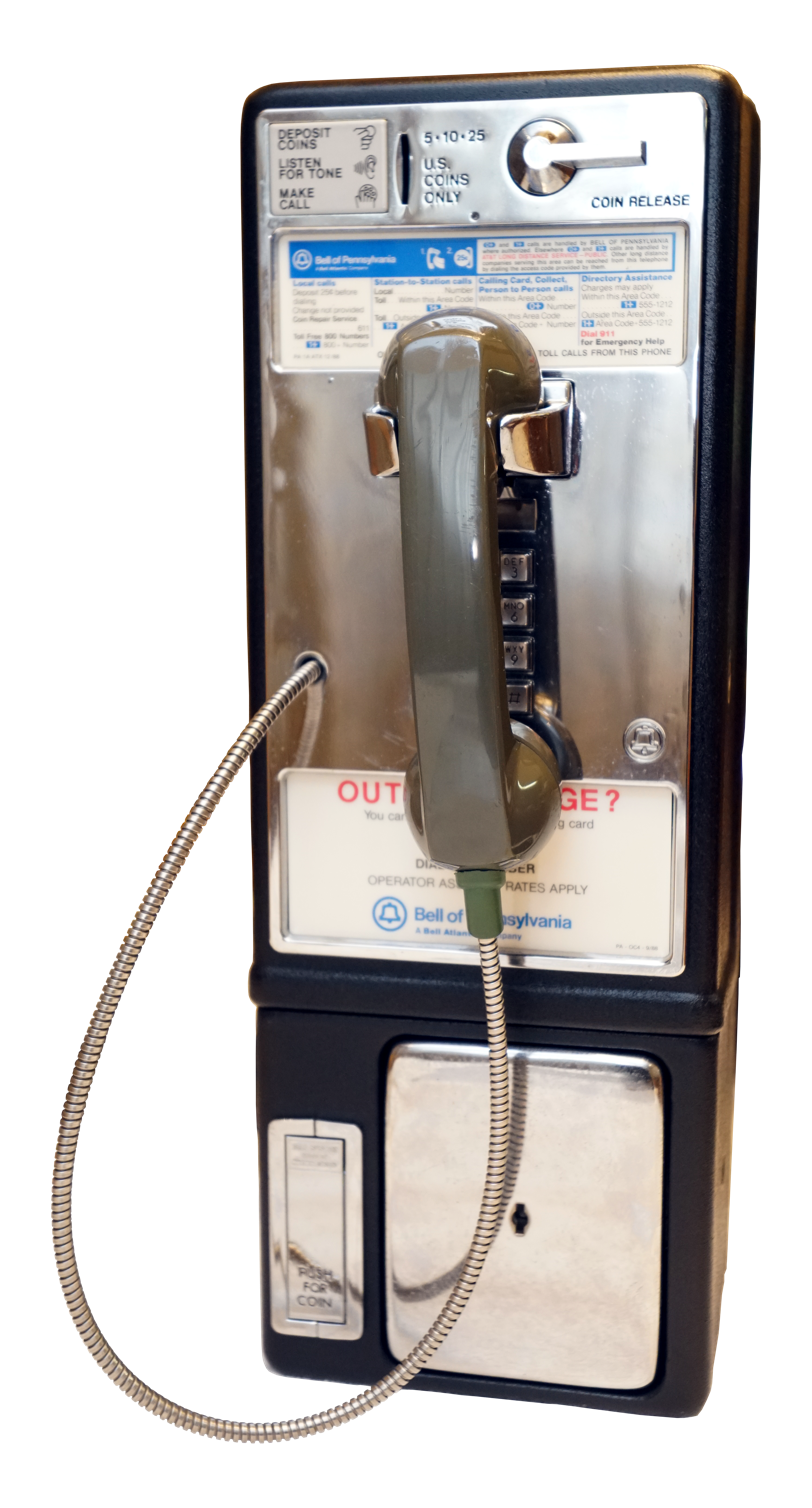
1C Payphone - Bell System, Made by Western Electric

"Dead-heads"--non-subscriber users who make a call at a place of business and do not pay for it--may have influenced the development of the payphone. The Wisconsin Telephone Company in 1893, for example, attempted to put an end to this practice by implementing ten-cent coin slots so that users had to pay for the call. The idea behind this was to reduce the financial stress a smaller business may face from having dead-heads.

Payphones were preceded by pay stations, staffed by telephone company attendants who would collect rapid payment for calls placed. The Connecticut Telephone Co. reportedly had a payphone in their New Haven office beginning 1 June 1880; the fee was handed to an attendant. In 1889, a public telephone with a coin-pay mechanism was installed at the Hartford Bank in Hartford, Connecticut, by the Southern New England Telephone Co. It was a "post-pay" machine; coins were inserted at the end of a conversation at the request of the operator. The coin mechanism was invented by William Gray; he was issued a series of patents for his devices, beginning with U.S. patent 454,470 issued 23 June 1891 for a "Signal Device for Telephone Pay-Stations" which rang a bell for each coin inserted. He subsequently founded the Telephone Pay Station Co. in 1891. The "pre-pay" phone debuted in Chicago in 1898.

In the late 1920s, the cost of a payphone call in the United States was two cents. In the 1930s, calls were five cents; the cost of a typical local call had risen to 10 cents by the 1960s, 15 cents during the 1970s, then 25 cents in the 1980s. By the early 21st century, the price of a local call was usually fifty cents. The rise of mobile phones led to the near extinction of payphones by the early 21st century. New York City, which once had 30,000, removed its last public payphone in 2022.

The Bell System & GTE 3-slot and single slot payphones took nickels (5¢), dimes (10¢), and quarters (25¢); on 3-slot models, a strip of metal along the top had holes the size of each coin all with denomination numbers, whereas single slot models had one coin slot for all 3 denominations. The US slang term "drop a dime" means to inform the authorities about another person, originally by placing a call from a pay phone. It can also refer to the placing of a phone call for social purposes. The term has risen in popularity in the US since the 1980s, and is still in use since 2000, despite the price increase of pay phones and the rise of mobile phones.

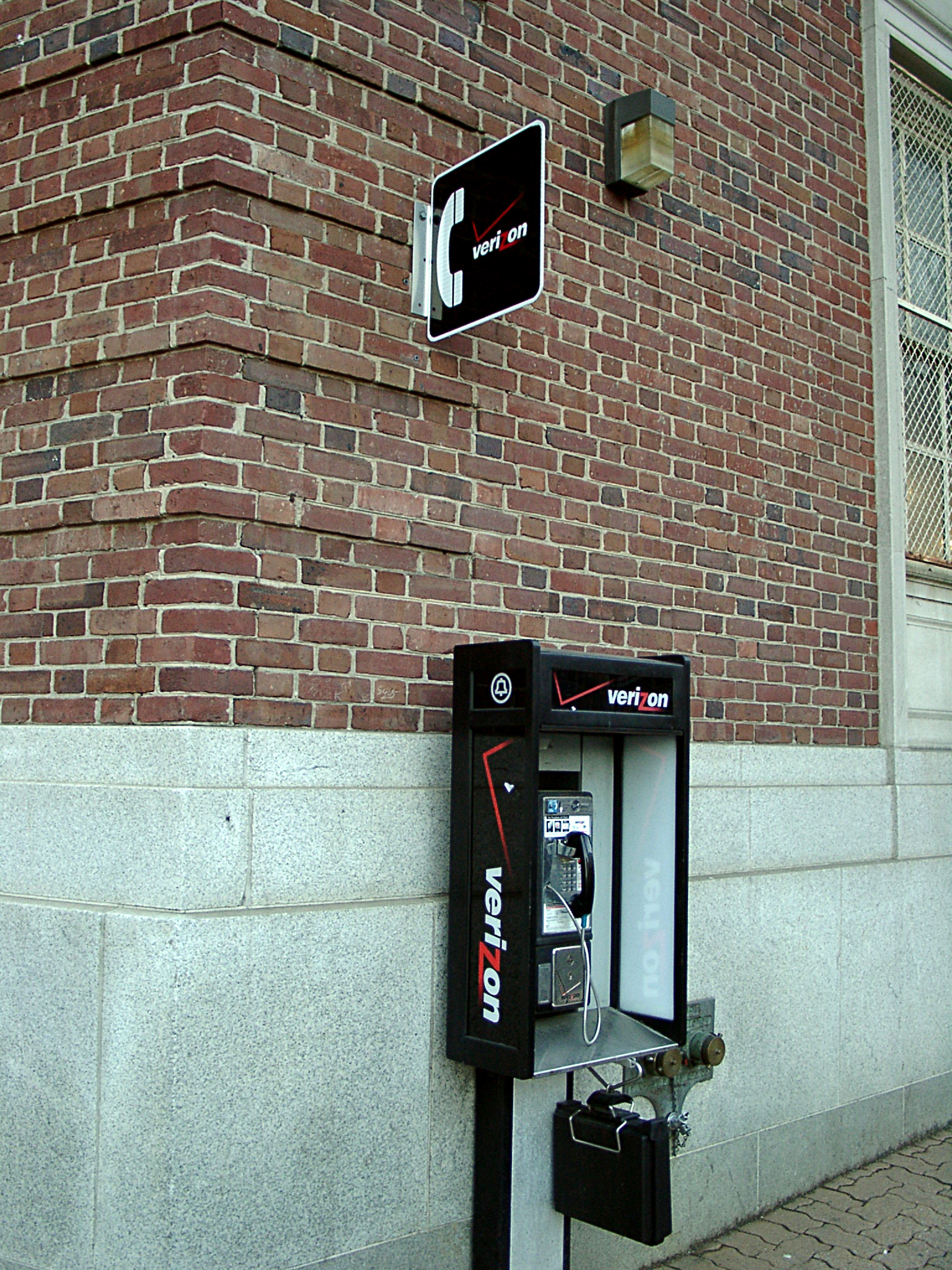
A Verizon payphone on a street corner in Silver Spring, MD

Payphone calls generally cost 5¢ into the 1950s and 10¢ until the mid-1980s. Rates standardized at 25¢ during the mid-1980s to early 1990s. The Bell System was required to apply for increases through state public service commissions. Therefore, the actual increases took effect at different times in different locations. The small town of Beggs, Oklahoma attracted national attention in the late 1970s when public payphones offering calls for only five cents had been essentially phased out across the country, but Beggs still had one. As of 2020, Beggs still has a nickel payphone, maintained in front of the Beggs Telephone Company office.

After the breakup of the Bell System in 1984, it was not long before independent stores selling telephones opened up. After that, privately owned payphones hit the market. Sources differ as to whether the peak number of payphones in the United States was 2.6 million in 1995 or 2.2 million in 2000. Since then the number of payphones in the United States has declined. In July 2009, AT&T officially stopped supporting the Public Payphone service. Over 139,000 locations were sold in 2009. At the end of 2012, the Federal Communications Commission (FCC) reported the number of payphones at 243,487 generating $362 million – falling to $286 million by 2015. The major carriers, AT&T and Verizon, exited the business, leaving the market to independent payphone companies. In 2018, it was estimated 100,000 payphones remained in the U.S., with roughly a fifth of them located in New York. Four years later, NYC removed its last public one, though some private pay phones remained on public property, and four full-length booths still stood on the Upper West Side in May 2022.

== Gallery ==
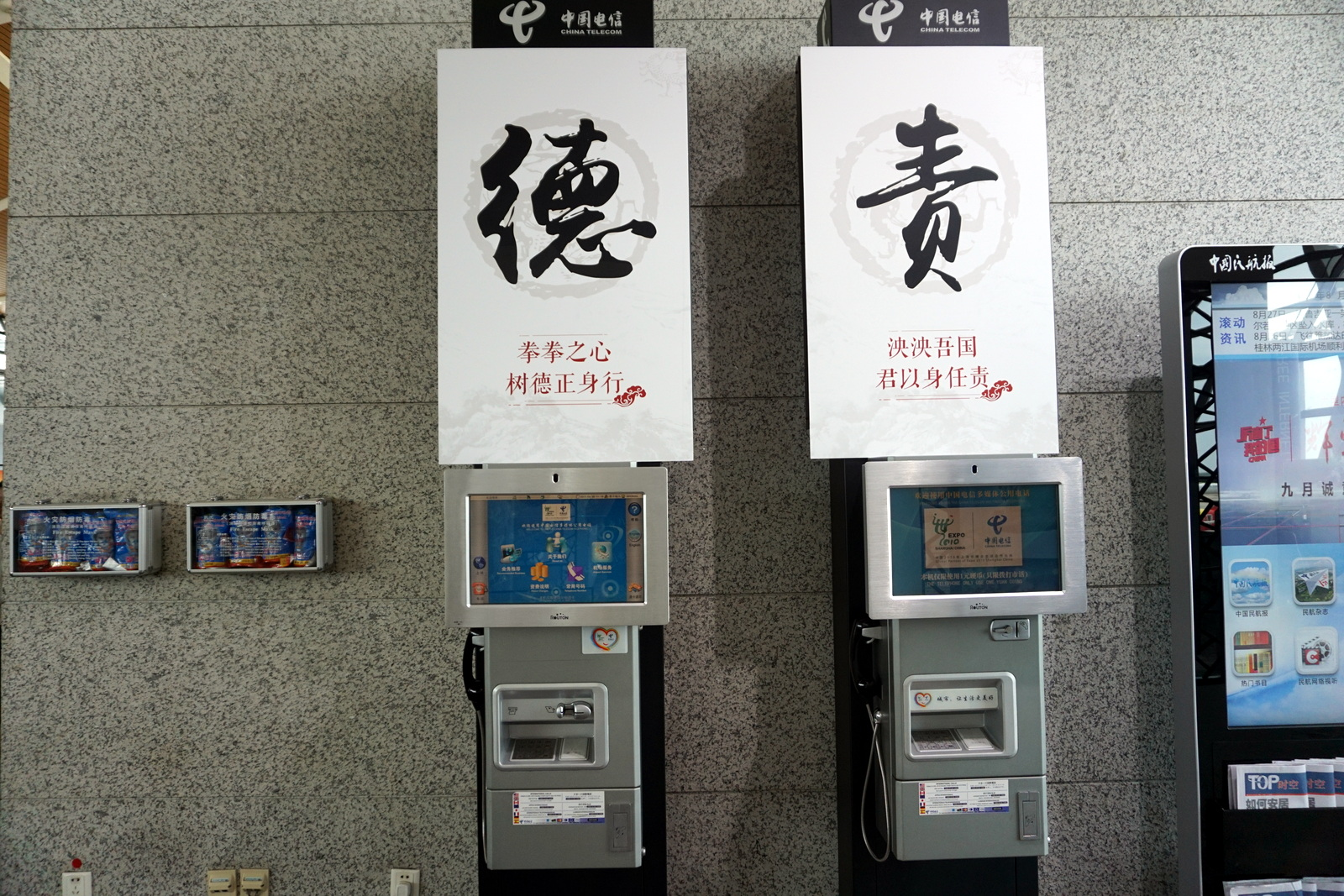
Payphones in China with built-in web browser

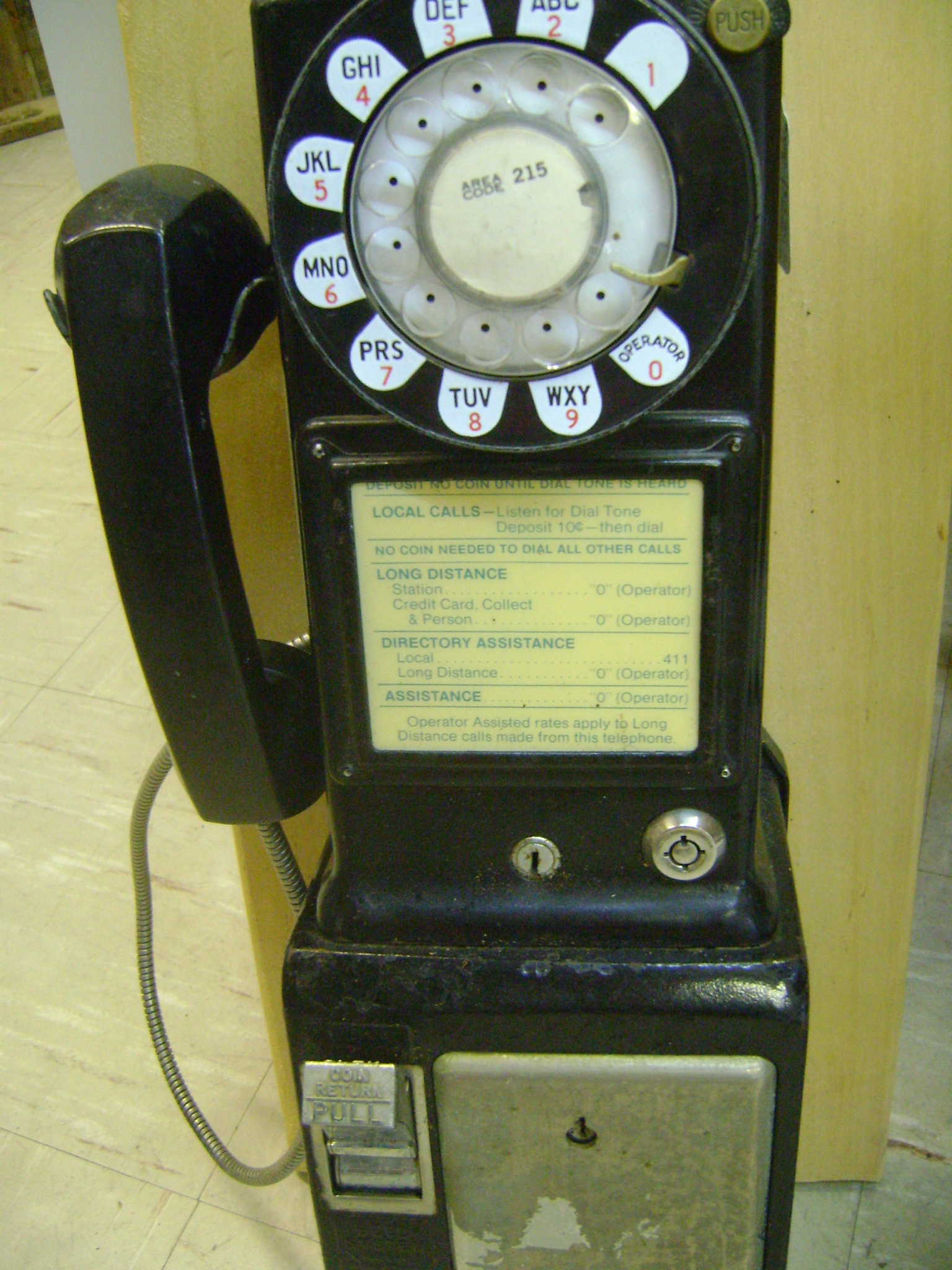
Typical 3-slot payphone (Western Electric 233G) commonly in use in the US until the late 1960s.

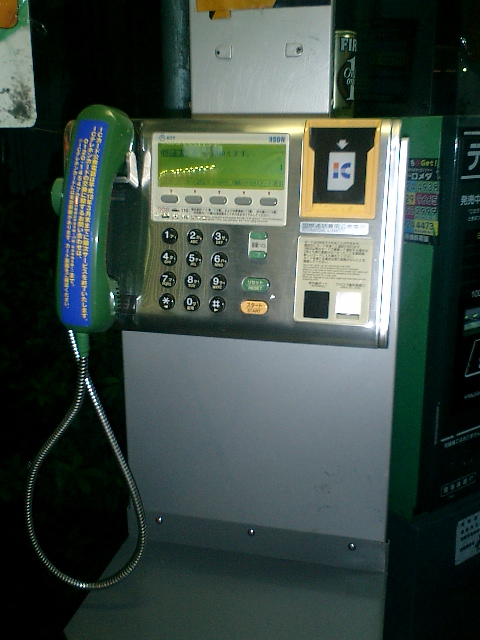
IC Payphone in Japan. This type of payphone was removed from town due to IC Card discontinued and continued to use magnetic Telephone Cards.

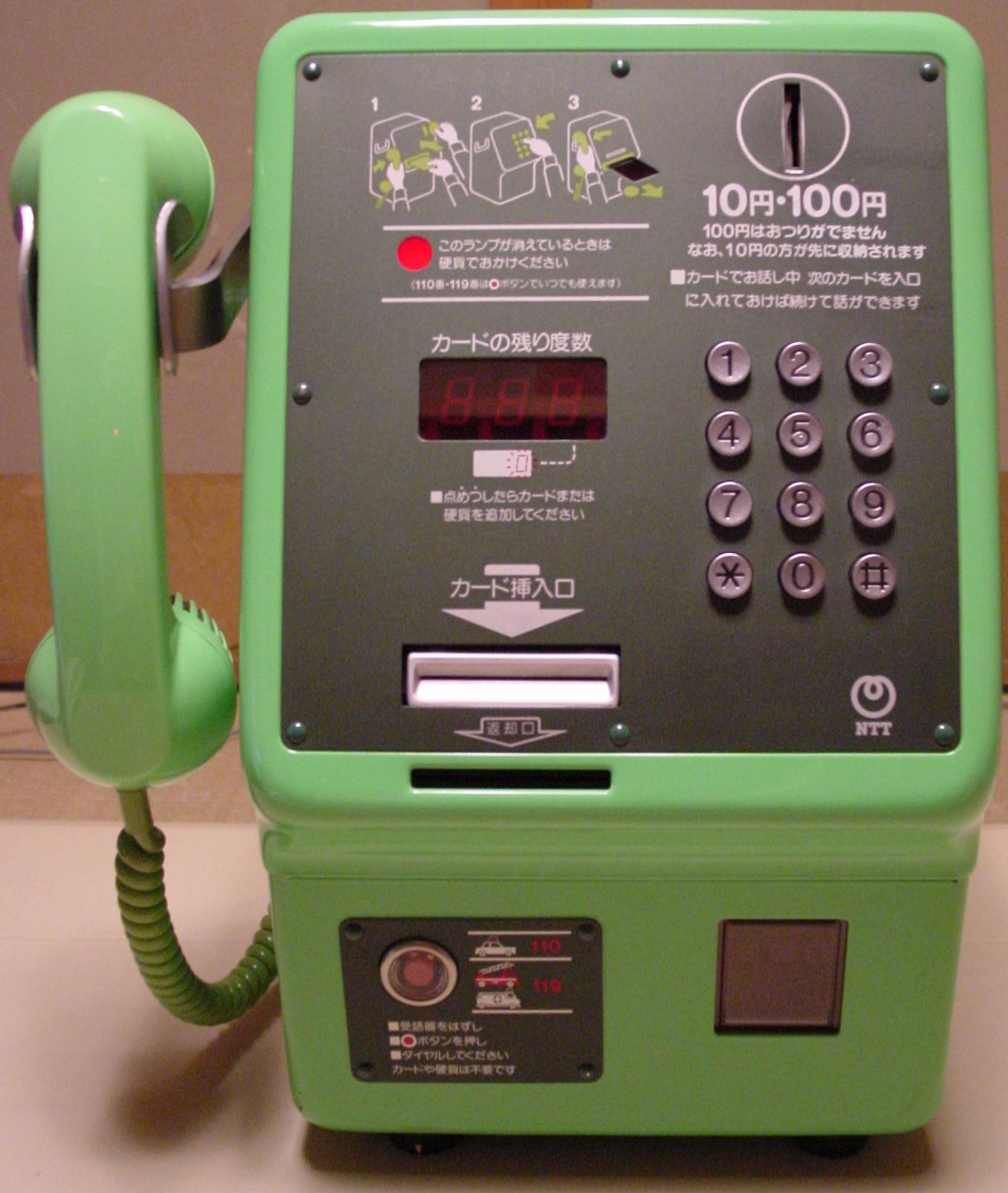
MC-3P Style magnetic Telephone Card accepted Payphone in Japan.

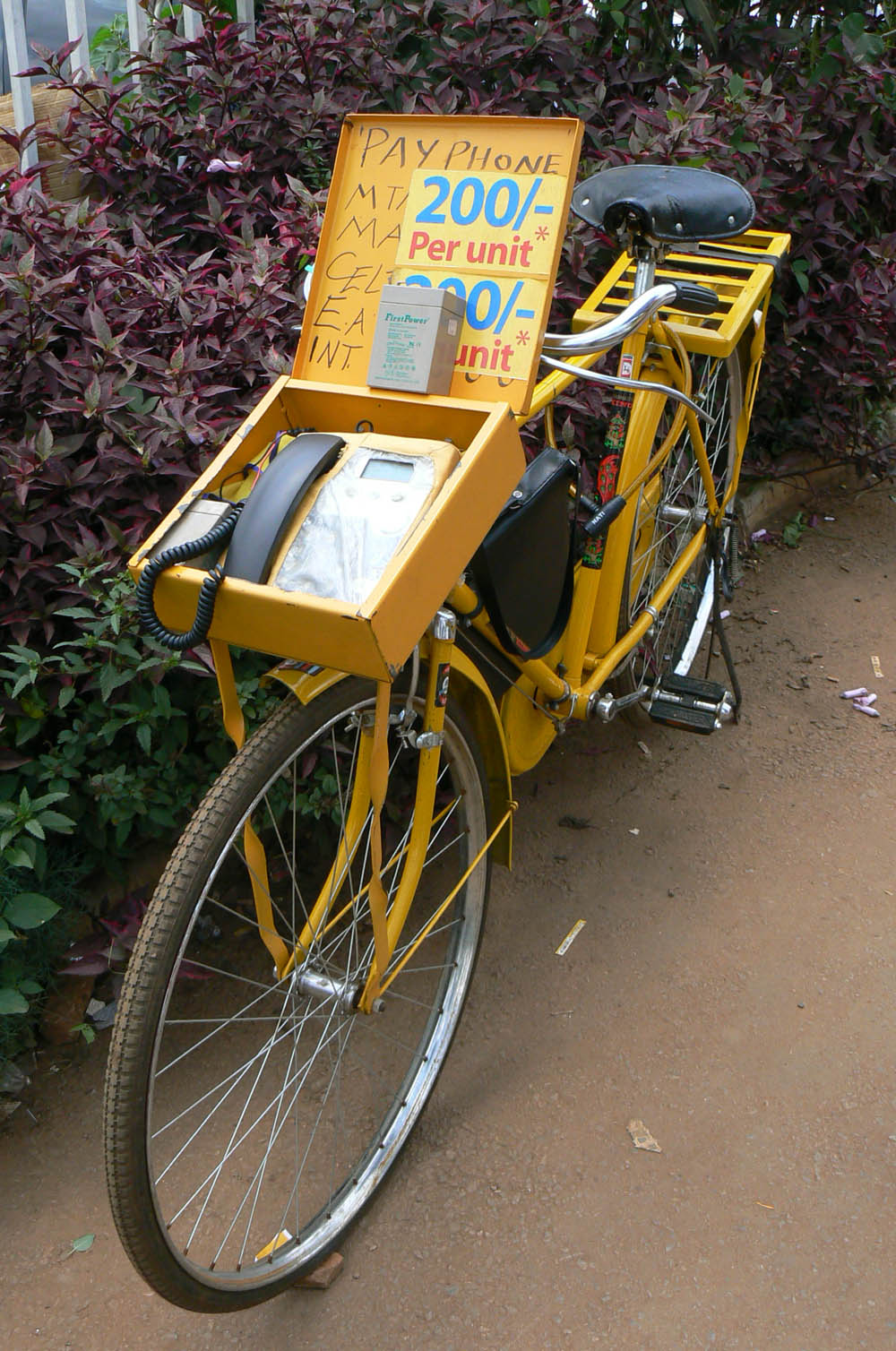
Bicycle payphone in Uganda

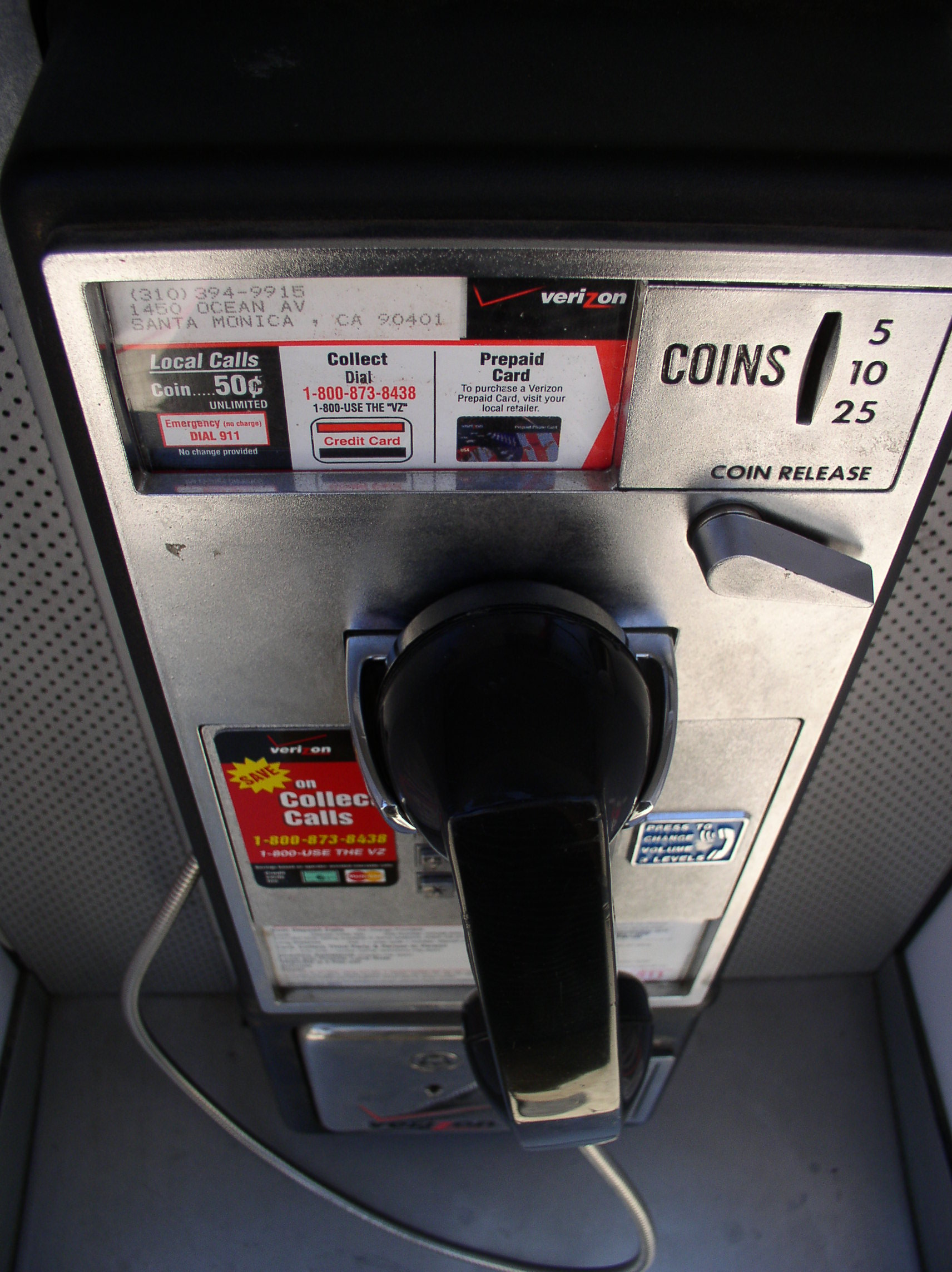
GTE Automatic Electric 120-series (specifically a 120C) single-slot coin phone in Santa Monica, California, United States

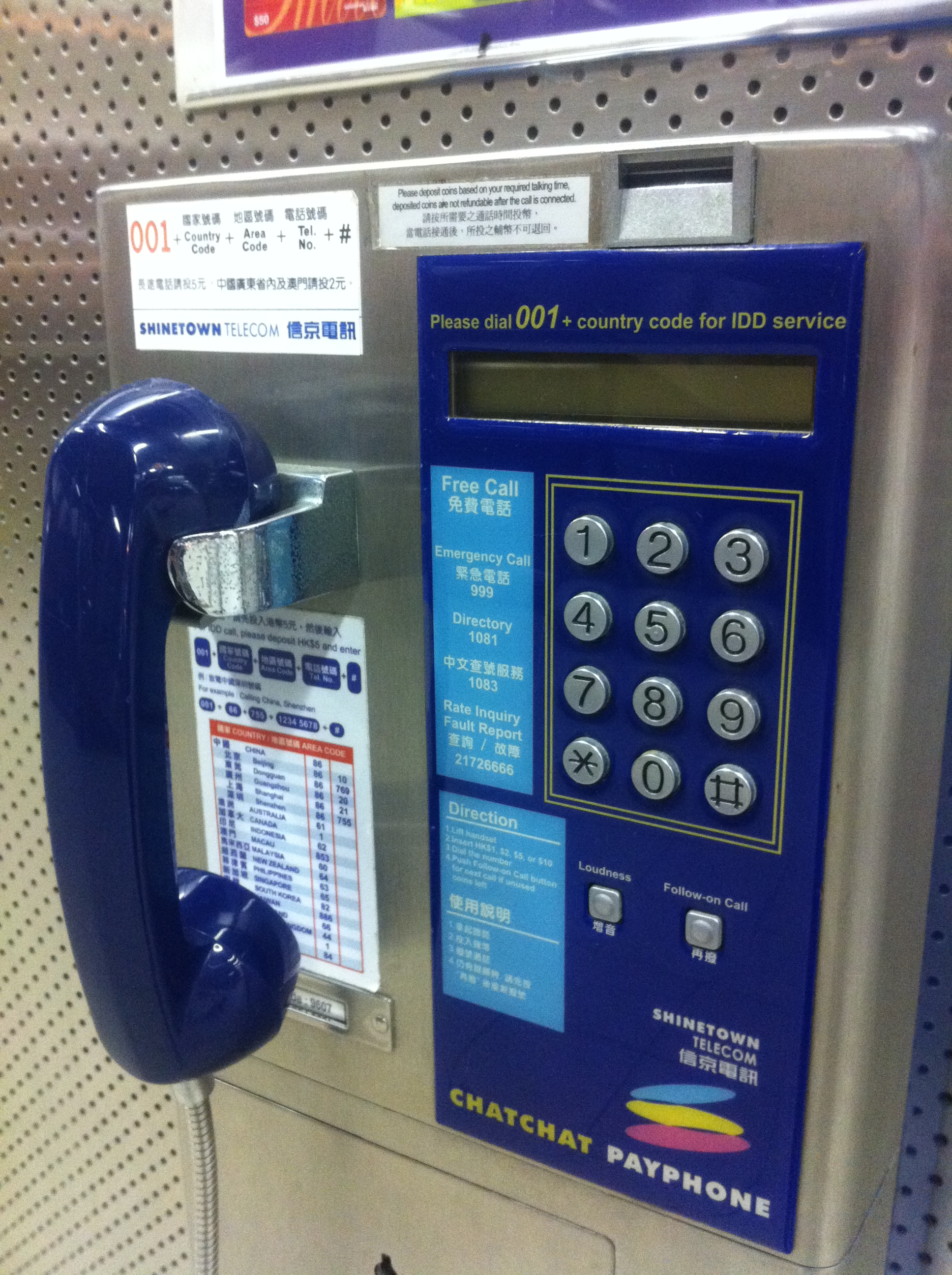
Hong Kong payphone

(video) Moving around a payphone in Japan, 2023

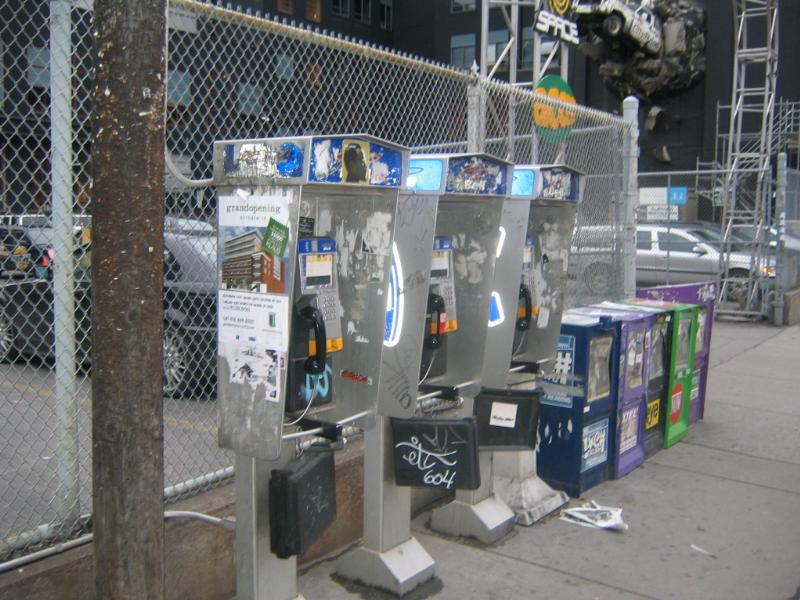
Nortel Millennium payphones operated by Bell Canada covered with graffiti and notices in Toronto. Telephone directories are contained in weatherproof holders hanging from the bottom of each phone.

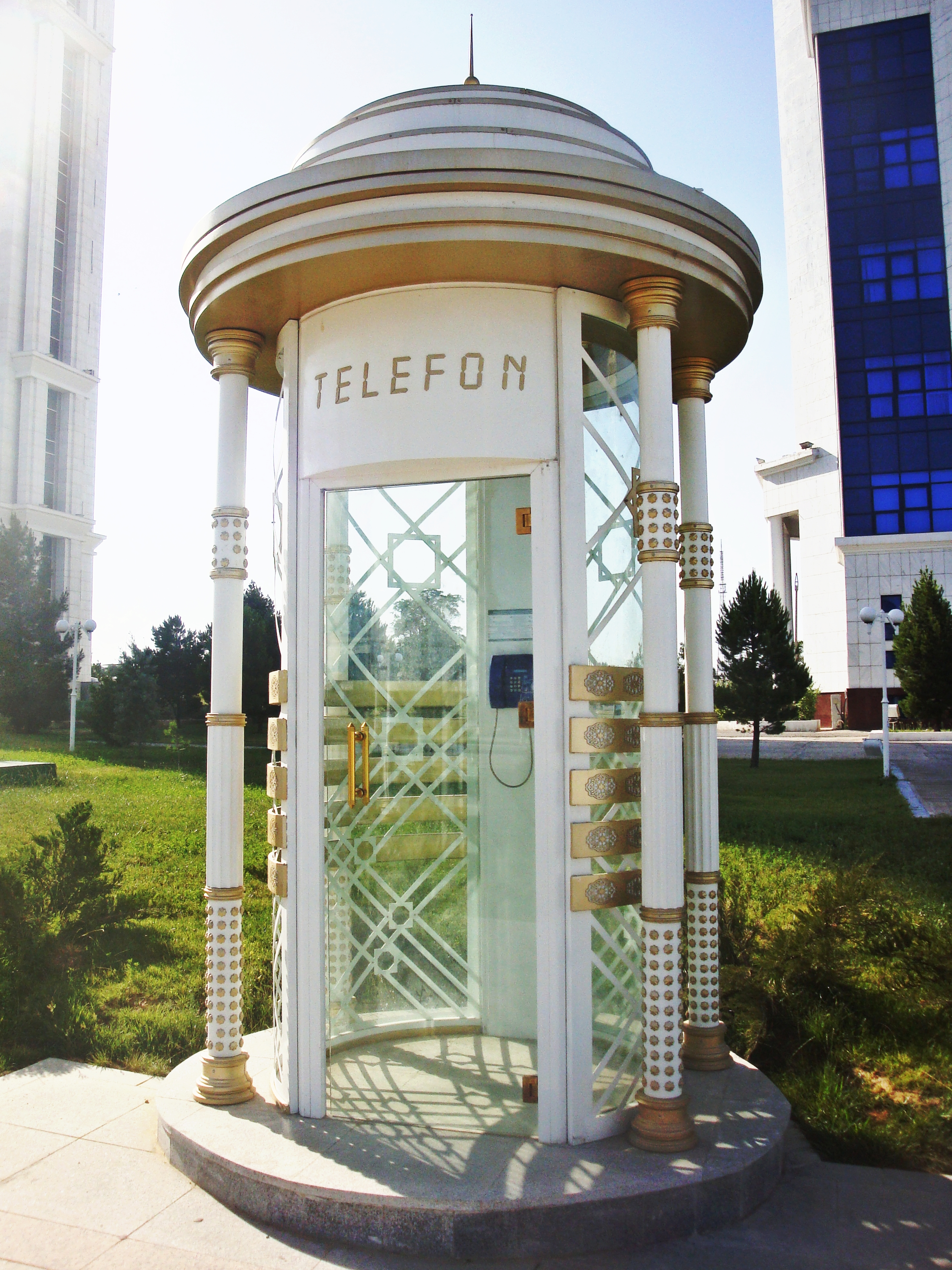
Payphone in Ashgabat

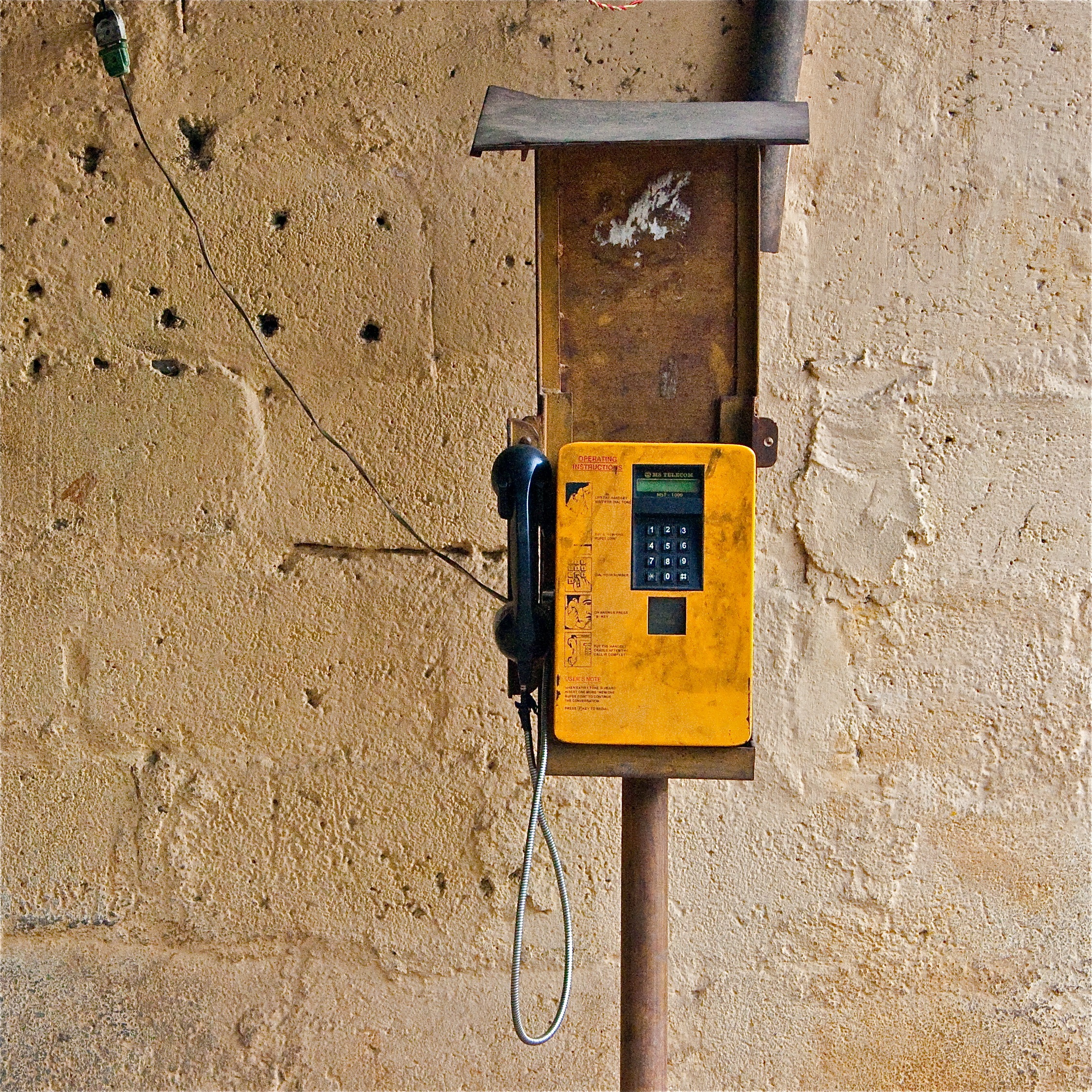
A payphone in India.

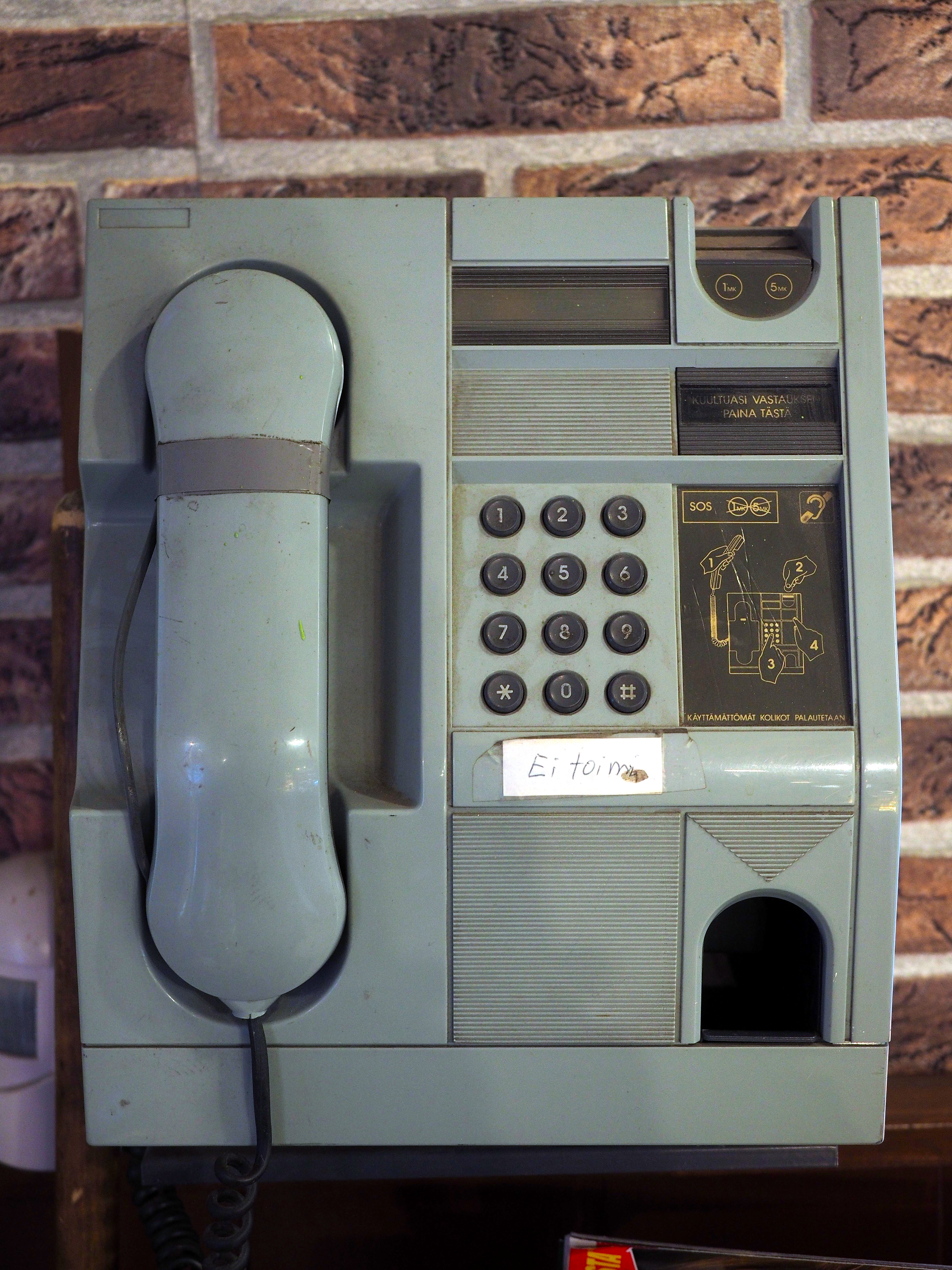
This Finnish payphone has a sticker saying "ei toimi" ("does not work") on it

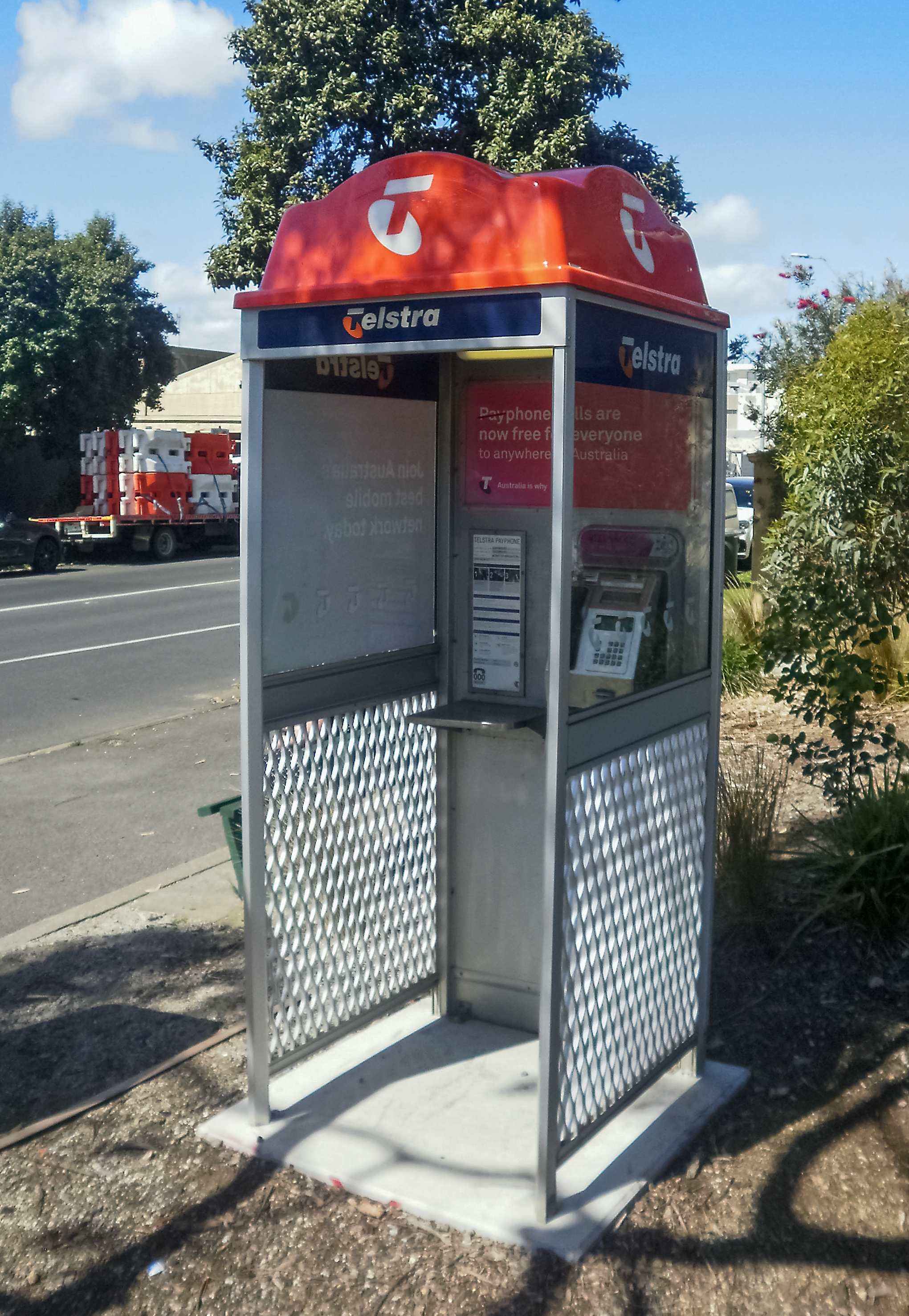
Payphone in Victoria, Australia 2021

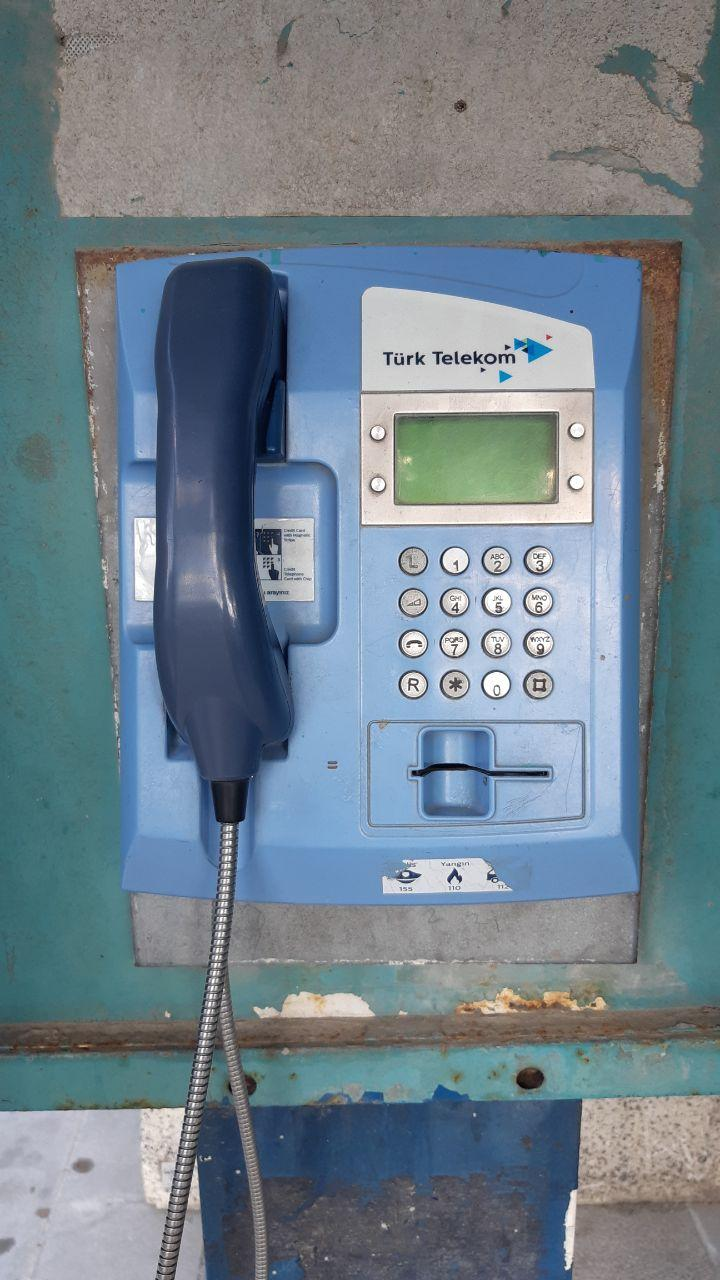
Türk Telekom payphone in Turkey.

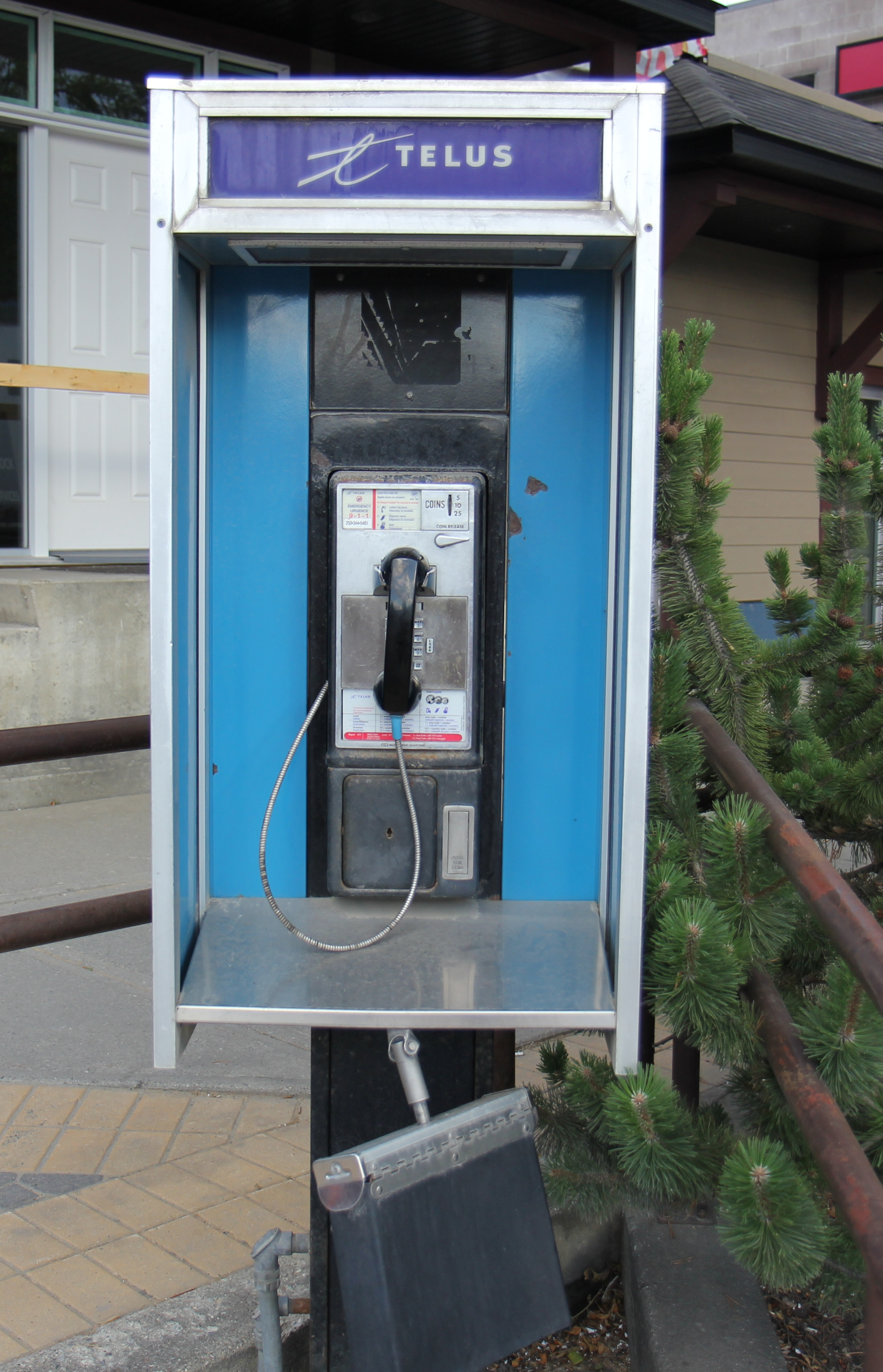
Telus Communications payphone in Golden, British Columbia

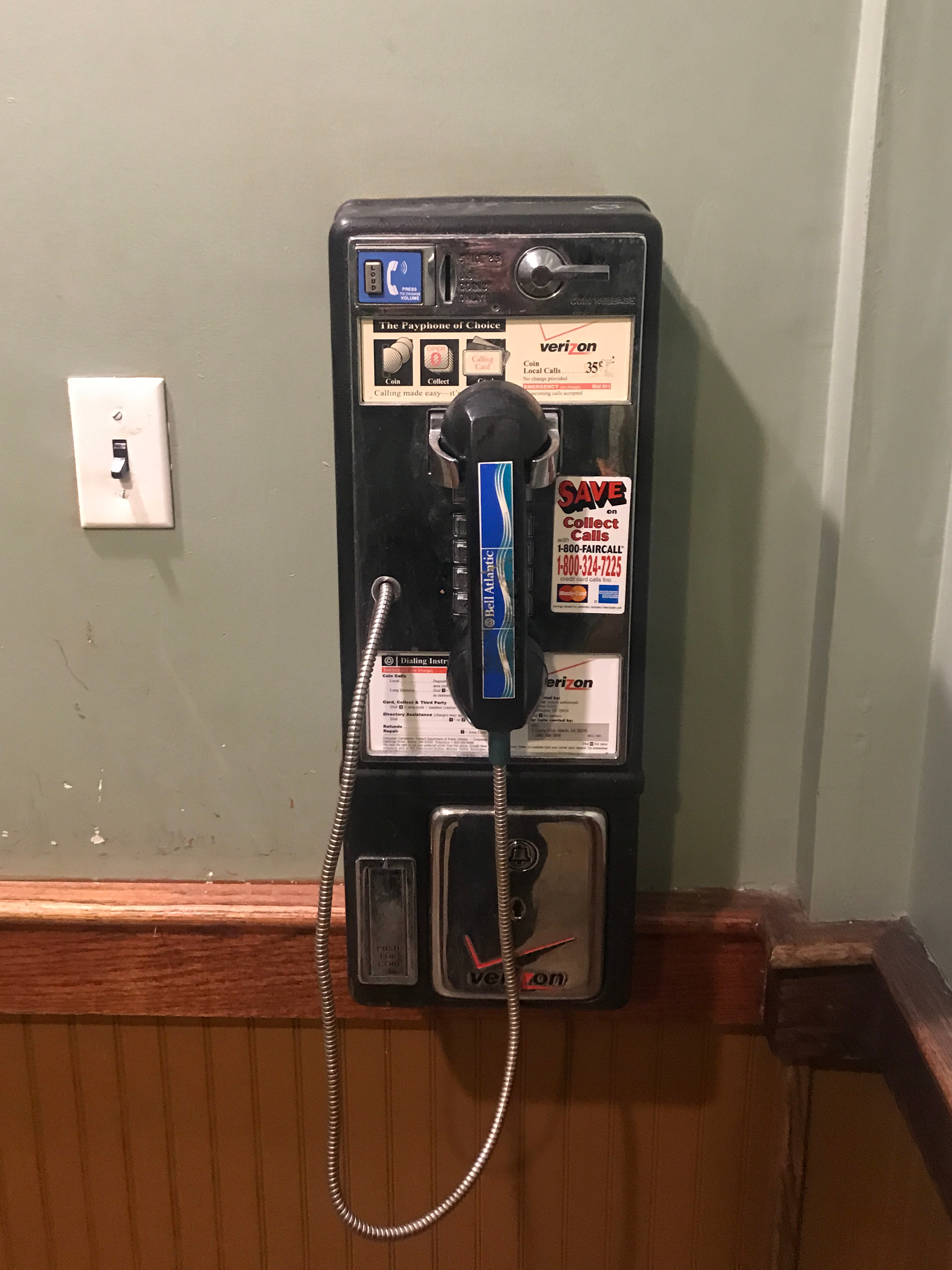
Indoor Verizon payphone in 2021

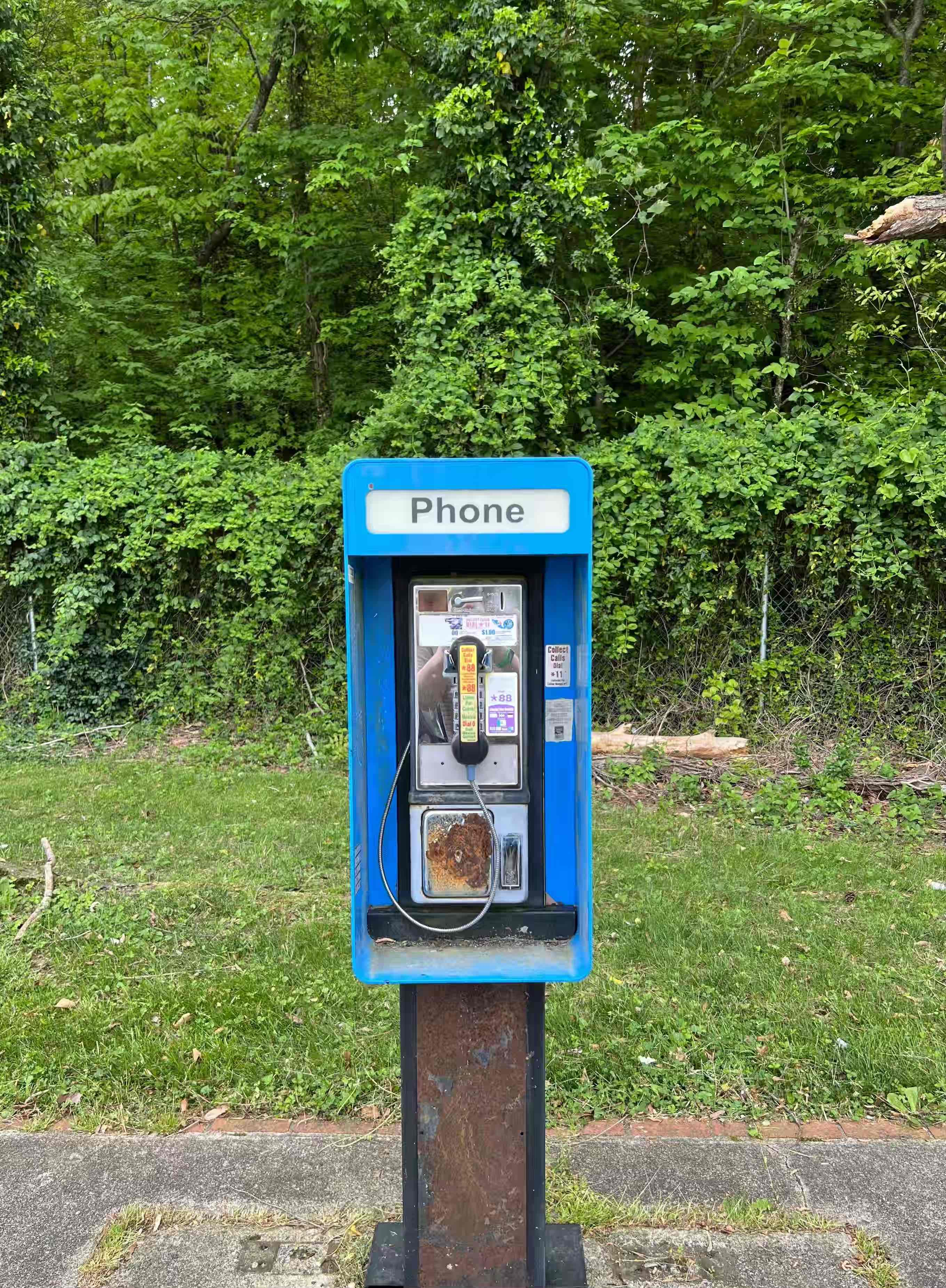
Payphone near Richmond, Virginia, United States, 2024.

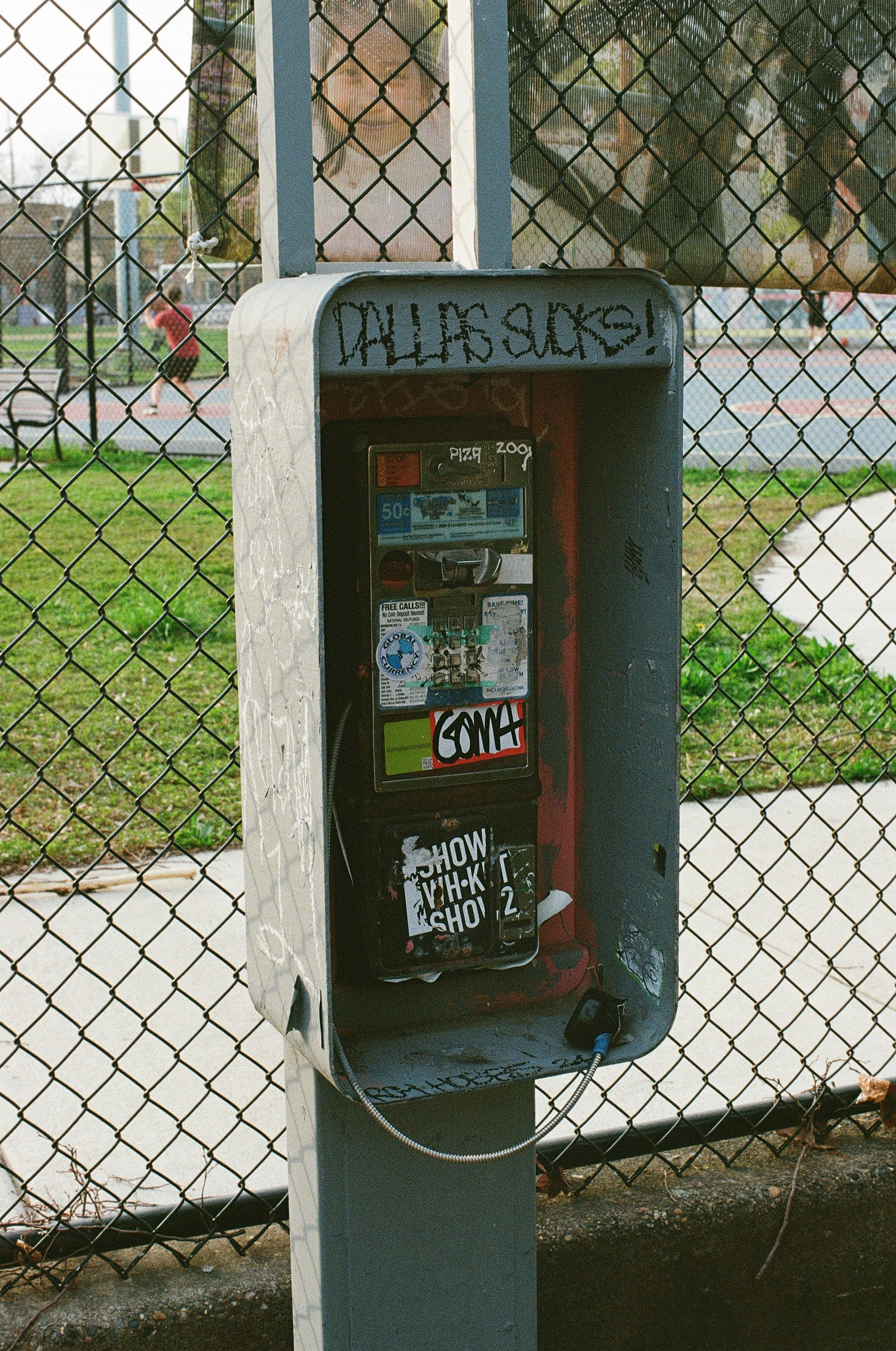
A dilapidated NewTel payphone in Philadelphia, Pennsylvania, 2025.

== See also ==
- Coin Paid Calls
- Red telephone box
- Telephone booth
