= Jessie Maye Smith =

American ornithologist

- Born: 8 April 1907 Wilbarger County, Texas
- Died: 5 April 2005 (aged 97) Fort Worth, Texas

Jessie Maye Smith, also known as "The Bird Lady of Tarrant County", was a self-taught ornithologist, made famous by a series of newspaper articles entitled "Birds and Watchers" which she published in the Fort Worth Star-Telegram from 1953 to 1975.

== Early years ==
Jessie Maye Smith was born in Wilbarger County, Texas on April 8, 1907. She grew up in Chillicothe, Texas and attended West Texas State College, studying English. In the 1920s, her family moved to Fort Worth where she met her future husband, Wade Austin Smith. The couple married in May 1928. It was around this time that an incident occurred which would inspire Jessie Maye Smith to take up birdwatching. She had accompanied her husband on a fishing trip and saw a red bird fly by. Knowing it wasn't a cardinal, she became intrigued and began conducting research at the local library to identify the species. It was during her study of these books, that she became fascinated with bird watching - a passion that would last the rest of her life.

== Community outreach and conservation efforts ==
Jessie Maye Smith was heavily involved in community service and conservation throughout her life. She volunteered with the Girl Scouts, serving as troop leader on nature walks and camping trips. She was also involved in the Fort Worth Museum of Science and History since its founding in 1941. She was a charter member of the Texas Ornithological Society, and instrumental in organizing the Fort Worth Audubon Society, serving as the Society's president for one year. She is also credited as one of the early supporters and proponents of the Fort Worth Nature Center and Refuge. Jessie Maye Smith was also an active member of the Fort Worth Conservation Council and collaborated with other conservation groups to protect natural habitats and establish wildlife refuges.

== Newspaper articles ==
On October 4, 1953, Jessie Maye Smith published her first "Birds and Watchers" article in the Fort Worth Star-Telegram. For over 21 years, she would continue to write an article for each Sunday issue of the newspaper, covering topics from Texas birding to ornithology throughout the United States, the Caribbean, and Central America. Her last newspaper article appeared on March 9, 1975. In the fall of 2005, the estate of Jessie Maye Smith, deeded the tear-sheets of these articles to the University of Texas at Arlington where they are held in the Library's Special Collections.

== Contributions and acknowledgements ==
- Pulich, Warren M. Birds of Tarrant County. Cornell University, 1979.
- Williamson, Sheri L. A Field Guide to Hummingbirds of North America. Houghton-Mifflin, 2001.
