= List of United Kingdom locations: Mar-Md =

The United Kingdom

This is part of the list of United Kingdom locations: a gazetteer of place names in the United Kingdom showing each place's locality and geographical coordinates.

== Ma (continued) ==
=== Mar ===
Location	Locality	Coordinates (links to map & photo sources)	OS grid reference
Màraig or Maaruig	Western Isles	57.95°N 06.73°W	NB2006
Marazanvose	Cornwall	50.30°N 05.09°W	SW8050
Marazion	Cornwall	50.11°N 05.48°W	SW5130
Marbhig	Western Isles	58.07°N 06.39°W	NB4118
Marbury	Cheshire	53.00°N 02.67°W	SJ5545
March	Cambridgeshire	52.54°N 00.07°E	TL4196
March	South Lanarkshire	55.41°N 03.59°W	NS9914
Marcham	Oxfordshire	51.66°N 01.35°W	SU4596
Marchamley	Shropshire	52.85°N 02.61°W	SJ5929
Marchamley Wood	Shropshire	52.87°N 02.61°W	SJ5931
Marchington	Staffordshire	52.86°N 01.80°W	SK1330
Marchington Woodlands	Staffordshire	52.84°N 01.83°W	SK1128
Marchwiel	Wrexham	53.01°N 02.97°W	SJ3547
Marchwood	Hampshire	50.88°N 01.46°W	SU3810
Marcross	The Vale Of Glamorgan	51.40°N 03.55°W	SS9269
Marcus	Angus	56.70°N 02.80°W	NO5157
Marden	Kent	51.16°N 00.48°E	TQ7444
Marden	Herefordshire	52.11°N 02.70°W	SO5247
Marden	Wiltshire	51.31°N 01.88°W	SU0857
Marden	North Tyneside	55.02°N 01.45°W	NZ3570
Marden Ash	Essex	51.69°N 00.24°E	TL5502
Marden Beech	Kent	51.16°N 00.47°E	TQ7343
Marden's Hill	East Sussex	51.06°N 00.13°E	
Marden Thorn	Kent	51.15°N 00.50°E	TQ7542
Mardleybury	Hertfordshire	51.84°N 00.17°W	TL2618
Mardu	Shropshire	52.44°N 03.09°W	SO2684
Mardy	Monmouthshire	51.82°N 03.01°W	SO3015
Mardy	Shropshire	52.88°N 03.07°W	SJ2833
Marefield	Leicestershire	52.65°N 00.90°W	SK7407
Mareham le Fen	Lincolnshire	53.13°N 00.10°W	TF2761
Mareham on the Hill	Lincolnshire	53.19°N 00.08°W	TF2868
Marehay	Derbyshire	53.02°N 01.41°W	SK3948
Marehill	West Sussex	50.95°N 00.49°W	TQ0618
Maresfield	East Sussex	50.99°N 00.07°E	TQ4624
Maresfield Park	East Sussex	50.99°N 00.07°E	TQ4624
Marfleet	City of Kingston upon Hull	53.74°N 00.28°W	TA1329
Marford	Wrexham	53.09°N 02.95°W	SJ3656
Margam	Neath Port Talbot	51.56°N 03.76°W	SS7887
Margaret Marsh	Dorset	50.96°N 02.25°W	ST8218
Margaret Roding	Essex	51.78°N 00.30°E	TL5912
Margaretting	Essex	51.68°N 00.41°E	TL6701
Margaretting Tye	Essex	51.67°N 00.43°E	TL6800
Margate	Kent	51.38°N 01.37°E	TR3570
Margery	Surrey	51.25°N 00.21°W	TQ2552
Margnaheglish (north Arran)	North Ayrshire	55.53°N 05.12°W	NS0331
Margnaheglish (west Arran)	North Ayrshire	55.69°N 05.29°W	NR9349
Margrove Park	Redcar and Cleveland	54.52°N 00.99°W	NZ6515
Marham	Norfolk	52.65°N 00.51°E	TF7009
Marhamchurch	Cornwall	50.79°N 04.52°W	SS2203
Marholm	Cambridgeshire	52.60°N 00.31°W	TF1402
Marian	Flintshire	53.30°N 03.36°W	SJ0979
Marian Cwm	Denbighshire	53.28°N 03.39°W	SJ0777
Mariandyrys	Isle of Anglesey	53.30°N 04.10°W	SH6081
Marian-glas or Marianglas	Isle of Anglesey	53.33°N 04.25°W	SH5084
Mariansleigh	Devon	50.98°N 03.79°W	SS7422
Marian-y-de (South Beach)	Gwynedd	52.87°N 04.42°W	SH3734
Marian-y-mor (West End)	Gwynedd	52.87°N 04.43°W	SH3634
Marine Town	Kent	51.43°N 00.76°E	TQ9274
Marionburgh	Aberdeenshire	57.14°N 02.49°W	NJ7006
Marishader	Highland	57.58°N 06.20°W	NG4963
Marjoriebanks	Dumfries and Galloway	55.13°N 03.44°W	NY0883
Mark	Somerset	51.21°N 02.88°W	ST3847
Markbeech	Kent	51.15°N 00.10°E	TQ4742
Markby	Lincolnshire	53.27°N 00.21°E	TF4878
Mark Causeway	Somerset	51.21°N 02.91°W	ST3647
Mark Cross (Rotherfield)	East Sussex	51.05°N 00.25°E	TQ5831
Mark Cross (Chalvington with Ripe / Laughton)	East Sussex	50.87°N 00.13°E	TQ5010
Markeaton	City of Derby	52.92°N 01.51°W	SK3337
Market Bosworth	Leicestershire	52.62°N 01.41°W	SK4003
Market Deeping	Lincolnshire	52.67°N 00.32°W	TF1310
Market Drayton	Shropshire	52.90°N 02.49°W	SJ6734
Market Harborough	Leicestershire	52.47°N 00.92°W	SP7387
Markethill	Perth and Kinross	56.53°N 03.27°W	NO2239
Market Lavington	Wiltshire	51.28°N 01.98°W	SU0154
Market Overton	Rutland	52.73°N 00.69°W	SK8816
Market Rasen	Lincolnshire	53.38°N 00.34°W	TF1089
Market Stainton	Lincolnshire	53.29°N 00.17°W	TF2279
Market Warsop	Nottinghamshire	53.19°N 01.16°W	SK5667
Market Weighton	East Riding of Yorkshire	53.85°N 00.67°W	SE8741
Market Weston	Suffolk	52.35°N 00.90°E	TL9877
Markfield	Leicestershire	52.68°N 01.29°W	SK4810
Mark Hall North	Essex	51.77°N 00.11°E	TL4611
Mark Hall South	Essex	51.76°N 00.11°E	TL4610
Markham	Caerphilly	51.70°N 03.21°W	SO1601
Markham Moor	Nottinghamshire	53.24°N 00.93°W	SK7173
Markinch	Fife	56.19°N 03.14°W	NO2901
Markington	North Yorkshire	54.08°N 01.55°W	SE2965
Markland Hill	Bolton	53.57°N 02.48°W	SD6809
Markle	East Lothian	55.98°N 02.69°W	NT5777
Marksbury	Bath and North East Somerset	51.35°N 02.48°W	ST6662
Mark's Corner	Isle of Wight	50.72°N 01.34°W	SZ4692
Marks Gate	Barking and Dagenham	51.58°N 00.13°E	TQ4890
Marks Tey	Essex	51.87°N 00.77°E	TL9123
Markyate	Hertfordshire	51.83°N 00.46°W	TL0616
Marland	Rochdale	53.59°N 02.19°W	SD8711
Marlas	Herefordshire	51.95°N 02.81°W	SO4429
Marl Bank	Herefordshire	52.05°N 02.32°W	SO7840
Marlborough	Wiltshire	51.41°N 01.74°W	SU1869
Marlbrook	Worcestershire	52.36°N 02.04°W	SO9774
Marlbrook	Herefordshire	52.18°N 02.73°W	SO5054
Marlcliff	Warwickshire	52.14°N 01.86°W	SP0950
Marlcombe	Devon		
Marldon	Devon	50.45°N 03.60°W	SX8663
Marle Green	East Sussex	50.92°N 00.24°E	TQ5816
Marle Hill	Gloucestershire	51.90°N 02.07°W	SO9523
Marlesford	Suffolk	52.17°N 01.39°E	TM3258
Marley (Maidstone)	Kent	51.20°N 01.11°E	TR1850
Marley (Deal)	Kent	51.22°N 01.33°E	TR3353
Marley Green	Cheshire	53.00°N 02.64°W	SJ5745
Marley Heights	West Sussex	51.06°N 00.73°W	SU8930
Marley Hill	Gateshead	54.91°N 01.68°W	NZ2058
Marley Pots	Sunderland	54.92°N 01.42°W	NZ3759
Marlingford	Norfolk	52.63°N 01.13°E	TG1209
Marloes	Pembrokeshire	51.72°N 05.20°W	SM7908
Marlow	Herefordshire	52.37°N 02.89°W	SO3976
Marlow	Buckinghamshire	51.56°N 00.77°W	SU8586
Marlow Bottom	Buckinghamshire	51.58°N 00.78°W	SU8488
Marlow Common	Buckinghamshire	51.56°N 00.81°W	SU8286
Marlpit Hill	Kent	51.20°N 00.06°E	TQ4447
Marlpits	East Sussex	50.89°N 00.41°E	TQ7013
Marlpool	Derbyshire	53.00°N 01.36°W	SK4345
Marnhull	Dorset	50.96°N 02.32°W	ST7718
Marnoch	Aberdeenshire	57.53°N 02.68°W	NJ5950
Marnoch or Marnock	North Lanarkshire	55.88°N 04.06°W	NS7168
Marple	Stockport	53.38°N 02.07°W	SJ9588
Marple Bridge	Stockport	53.39°N 02.06°W	SJ9689
Marpleridge	Stockport	53.38°N 02.07°W	SJ9587
Marr	Doncaster	53.53°N 01.23°W	SE5105
Marrel	Highland	58.13°N 03.68°W	ND0117
Marr Green	Wiltshire	51.33°N 01.68°W	SU2260
Marrick	North Yorkshire	54.37°N 01.89°W	SE0798
Marrister	Shetland Islands	60.35°N 01.02°W	HU5464
Marros	Carmarthenshire	51.74°N 04.60°W	SN2008
Marsden	South Tyneside	54.96°N 01.39°W	NZ3964
Marsden	Kirklees	53.59°N 01.94°W	SE0411
Marsden Height	Lancashire	53.82°N 02.21°W	SD8636
Marsett	North Yorkshire	54.27°N 02.15°W	SD9086
Marsh	Devon	50.88°N 03.06°W	ST2510
Marsh	Buckinghamshire	51.77°N 00.82°W	SP8109
Marsh	Bradford	53.81°N 01.97°W	SE0235
Marsh	Kirklees	53.64°N 01.81°W	SE1217
Marshall Meadows	Northumberland	55.79°N 02.04°W	NT9756
Marshall's Cross	St Helens	53.42°N 02.73°W	SJ5192
Marshall's Elm	Somerset	51.10°N 02.74°W	ST4834
Marshalls Heath	Hertfordshire	51.82°N 00.31°W	TL1615
Marshalsea	Dorset	50.79°N 02.88°W	ST3800
Marshalswick	Hertfordshire	51.75°N 00.32°W	TL1608
Marsham	Norfolk	52.76°N 01.24°E	TG1924
Marsh Baldon	Oxfordshire	51.68°N 01.19°W	SU5699
Marsh Benham	Berkshire	51.40°N 01.39°W	SU4267
Marshborough	Kent	51.26°N 01.29°E	TR3057
Marshbrook	Shropshire	52.49°N 02.84°W	SO4389
Marshchapel	Lincolnshire	53.47°N 00.03°E	TF3599
Marsh Common	South Gloucestershire	51.54°N 02.63°W	ST5683
Marsh End	Worcestershire	52.01°N 02.27°W	SO8135
Marshfield	City of Newport	51.53°N 03.08°W	ST2582
Marshfield	South Gloucestershire	51.45°N 02.33°W	ST7773
Marshfield Bank	Cheshire	53.09°N 02.49°W	SJ6755
Marshgate	Cornwall	50.68°N 04.62°W	SX1591
Marsh Gate	Berkshire	51.41°N 01.54°W	SU3268
Marsh Gibbon	Buckinghamshire	51.90°N 01.07°W	SP6423
Marsh Green	Kent	51.17°N 00.05°E	TQ4444
Marsh Green	Devon	50.72°N 03.36°W	SY0493
Marsh Green	Cheshire	53.28°N 02.73°W	SJ5177
Marsh Green	Wigan	53.54°N 02.68°W	SD5506
Marsh Green	Staffordshire	53.12°N 02.18°W	SJ8859
Marsh Green	Shropshire	52.72°N 02.59°W	SJ6014
Marsh Houses	Lancashire	53.95°N 02.83°W	SD4551
Marshland St James	Norfolk	52.65°N 00.23°E	TF5109
Marsh Lane	Gloucestershire	51.76°N 02.61°W	SO5807
Marsh Lane	Derbyshire	53.30°N 01.40°W	SK4079
Marsh Mills	Somerset	51.13°N 03.15°W	ST1938
Marshmoor	Hertfordshire	51.73°N 00.21°W	TL2306
Marshside	Kent	51.34°N 01.18°E	TR2266
Marshside	Sefton	53.66°N 02.97°W	SD3619
Marsh Side	Norfolk	52.96°N 00.63°E	TF7744
Marsh Street	Somerset	51.18°N 03.44°W	SS9944
Marshwood	Dorset	50.78°N 02.88°W	SY3899
Marske	North Yorkshire	54.39°N 01.84°W	NZ1000
Marske-By-The-Sea	Redcar and Cleveland	54.58°N 01.02°W	NZ6322
Marston (Wolston)	Warwickshire	52.38°N 01.38°W	SP4276
Marston (Lea Marston)	Warwickshire	52.54°N 01.70°W	SP2094
Marston	Herefordshire	52.20°N 02.93°W	SO3657
Marston	Oxfordshire	51.76°N 01.24°W	SP5208
Marston	Wiltshire	51.30°N 02.05°W	ST9656
Marston	Cheshire	53.27°N 02.51°W	SJ6675
Marston	Lincolnshire	52.97°N 00.67°W	SK8943
Marston (near Stafford)	Staffordshire	52.84°N 02.12°W	SJ9227
Marston (near Brewood)	Staffordshire	52.72°N 02.25°W	SJ8314
Marston Bigot	Somerset	51.19°N 02.35°W	ST7544
Marston Doles	Warwickshire	52.21°N 01.32°W	SP4658
Marston Gate	Somerset	51.21°N 02.34°W	ST7646
Marston Green	Solihull	52.46°N 01.75°W	SP1785
Marston Hill	Wiltshire	51.68°N 01.81°W	SU1399
Marston Jabbett	Warwickshire	52.48°N 01.45°W	SP3788
Marston Magna	Somerset	50.99°N 02.58°W	ST5922
Marston Meysey	Wiltshire	51.67°N 01.82°W	SU1297
Marston Montgomery	Derbyshire	52.93°N 01.80°W	SK1337
Marston Moretaine or Marston Moreteyne	Bedfordshire	52.05°N 00.55°W	SP9941
Marston on Dove	Derbyshire	52.85°N 01.65°W	SK2329
Marston Stannett	Herefordshire	52.19°N 02.64°W	SO5655
Marston St Lawrence	Northamptonshire	52.07°N 01.22°W	SP5342
Marston Trussell	Northamptonshire	52.45°N 00.98°W	SP6985
Marstow	Herefordshire	51.86°N 02.65°W	SO5519
Marsworth	Buckinghamshire	51.81°N 00.66°W	SP9214
Marten	Wiltshire	51.33°N 01.59°W	SU2860
Marthall	Cheshire	53.27°N 02.30°W	SJ8075
Martham	Norfolk	52.70°N 01.63°E	TG4518
Marthwaite	Cumbria	54.31°N 02.55°W	SD6491
Martin	Kent	51.17°N 01.33°E	TR3347
Martin	Hampshire	50.97°N 01.91°W	SU0619
Martin (North Kesteven)	Lincolnshire	53.11°N 00.32°W	TF1259
Martin (East Lindsey)	Lincolnshire	53.17°N 00.16°W	TF2366
Martindale	Cumbria	54.56°N 02.88°W	NY4319
Martin Dales	Lincolnshire	53.13°N 00.25°W	TF1761
Martin Drove End	Hampshire	50.98°N 01.93°W	SU0521
Martinhoe	Devon	51.21°N 03.92°W	SS6648
Martinhoe Cross	Devon	51.19°N 03.89°W	SS6846
Martin Hussingtree	Worcestershire	52.23°N 02.17°W	SO8860
Martin Mill	Kent	51.16°N 01.34°E	TR3446
Martin Moor	Lincolnshire	53.15°N 00.19°W	TF2164
Martinscroft	Cheshire	53.39°N 02.52°W	SJ6589
Martin's Moss	Cheshire	53.13°N 02.30°W	SJ8060
Martinstown (Winterborne St Martin)	Dorset	50.69°N 02.51°W	SY6488
Martlesham	Suffolk	52.07°N 01.28°E	TM2547
Martlesham Heath	Suffolk	52.05°N 01.26°E	TM2445
Martletwy	Pembrokeshire	51.75°N 04.85°W	SN0310
Martley	Worcestershire	52.22°N 02.36°W	SO7559
Martock	Somerset	50.96°N 02.77°W	ST4619
Marton	Cheshire	53.20°N 02.22°W	SJ8568
Marton	Cumbria	54.18°N 03.16°W	SD2477
Marton (Burton Constable)	East Riding of Yorkshire	53.83°N 00.22°W	TA1739
Marton (Bridlington)	East Riding of Yorkshire	54.11°N 00.16°W	TA2069
Marton	Lincolnshire	53.31°N 00.75°W	SK8381
Marton	Middlesbrough	54.52°N 01.21°W	NZ5115
Marton (Harrogate)	North Yorkshire	54.05°N 01.37°W	SE4162
Marton (Ryedale)	North Yorkshire	54.23°N 00.88°W	SE7383
Marton (Myddle, Broughton and Harmer Hill)	Shropshire	52.80°N 02.83°W	SJ4423
Marton (Marton-in-Chirbury)	Shropshire	52.61°N 03.06°W	SJ2802
Marton	Warwickshire	52.30°N 01.41°W	SP4068
Marton Green	Cheshire	53.19°N 02.58°W	SJ6167
Marton Grove	Middlesbrough	54.55°N 01.24°W	NZ4918
Marton-in-the-Forest	North Yorkshire	54.10°N 01.09°W	SE5968
Marton-le-Moor	North Yorkshire	54.12°N 01.43°W	SE3770
Marton Moor	Warwickshire	52.30°N 01.41°W	SP4068
Marton Moss Side	Lancashire	53.78°N 03.01°W	SD3333
Martyr's Green	Surrey	51.30°N 00.43°W	TQ0957
Martyr Worthy	Hampshire	51.08°N 01.27°W	SU5132
Marwick	Orkney Islands	59.09°N 03.34°W	HY2324
Marwood	Devon	51.11°N 04.08°W	SS5437
Marybank (Easter Ross)	Highland	57.75°N 04.11°W	NH7476
Marybank (Ross-shire)	Highland	57.54°N 04.54°W	NH4853
Marybank	Western Isles	58.21°N 06.41°W	NB405339
Maryburgh	Highland	57.57°N 04.44°W	NH5456
Maryburgh	Perth and Kinross	56.15°N 03.39°W	NT1396
Maryfield	Cornwall	50.37°N 04.22°W	SX4255
Maryhill	City of Glasgow	55.88°N 04.30°W	NS5668
Marykirk	Aberdeenshire	56.77°N 02.52°W	NO6865
Maryland	Monmouthshire	51.74°N 02.71°W	SO5105
Marylebone	City of Westminster	51.51°N 00.15°W	TQ2881
Marylebone	Wigan	53.55°N 02.63°W	SD5807
Marypark	Moray	57.42°N 03.35°W	NJ1938
Maryport	Cumbria	54.71°N 03.50°W	NY0336
Mary Tavy	Devon	50.59°N 04.12°W	SX5079
Maryton (near Montrose)	Angus	56.69°N 02.52°W	NO6856
Maryton (Kirriemuir)	Angus	56.66°N 02.99°W	NO3953
Marywell	Angus	56.58°N 02.57°W	NO6544
Marywell (Kincardineshire coast)	Aberdeenshire	57.05°N 02.69°W	NO5896
Marywell (Lower Deeside)	Aberdeenshire	57.08°N 02.13°W	NO9299

=== Mas–Maz ===
Location	Locality	Coordinates (links to map & photo sources)	OS grid reference
Masbrough	Rotherham	53.42°N 01.38°W	SK4192
Mascle Bridge	Pembrokeshire	51.70°N 04.96°W	SM9505
Masham	North Yorkshire	54.21°N 01.66°W	SE2280
Mashbury	Essex	51.77°N 00.39°E	TL6511
Mason	Newcastle upon Tyne	55.05°N 01.68°W	NZ2073
Masongill	North Yorkshire	54.17°N 02.52°W	SD6675
Masonhill	South Ayrshire	55.45°N 04.61°W	NS3521
Mastin Moor	Derbyshire	53.27°N 01.32°W	SK4575
Mastrick	City of Aberdeen	57.14°N 02.16°W	NJ9006
Matchborough	Worcestershire	52.29°N 01.89°W	SP0766
Matching	Essex	51.77°N 00.20°E	TL5211
Matching Green	Essex	51.76°N 00.21°E	TL5310
Matching Tye	Essex	51.77°N 00.18°E	TL5111
Matfen	Northumberland	55.03°N 01.95°W	NZ0371
Matfield	Kent	51.14°N 00.35°E	TQ6541
Mathern	Monmouthshire	51.61°N 02.69°W	ST5291
Mathon	Herefordshire	52.10°N 02.39°W	SO7345
Mathry	Pembrokeshire	51.93°N 05.10°W	SM8731
Matlaske	Norfolk	52.86°N 01.19°E	TG1534
Matley	Tameside	53.46°N 02.03°W	SJ9896
Matlock	Derbyshire	53.12°N 01.56°W	SK2959
Matlock Bank	Derbyshire	53.13°N 01.56°W	SK2960
Matlock Bath	Derbyshire	53.11°N 01.56°W	SK2958
Matlock Bridge	Derbyshire	53.12°N 01.56°W	SK2959
Matlock Cliff	Derbyshire	53.12°N 01.53°W	SK3159
Matlock Dale	Derbyshire	53.11°N 01.56°W	SK2958
Matshead	Lancashire	53.85°N 02.74°W	SD5140
Matson	Gloucestershire	51.83°N 02.21°W	SO8515
Matterdale End	Cumbria	54.59°N 02.94°W	NY3923
Mattersey	Nottinghamshire	53.39°N 00.97°W	SK6889
Mattersey Thorpe	Nottinghamshire	53.40°N 00.99°W	SK6790
Matthewsgreen	Berkshire	51.41°N 00.85°W	SU8069
Mattingley	Hampshire	51.30°N 00.95°W	SU7357
Mattishall	Norfolk	52.65°N 01.03°E	TG0511
Mattishall Burgh	Norfolk	52.65°N 01.03°E	TG0511
Mauchline	East Ayrshire	55.51°N 04.39°W	NS4927
Maud	Aberdeenshire	57.51°N 02.13°W	NJ9247
Maudlin	West Sussex	50.84°N 00.75°W	SU8806
Maudlin	Dorset	50.84°N 02.88°W	ST3805
Maudlin	Cornwall	50.42°N 04.70°W	SX0862
Maudlin Cross	Dorset	50.84°N 02.88°W	ST3805
Maugersbury	Gloucestershire	51.92°N 01.71°W	SP2025
Maughold	Isle of Man	54.29°N 04.32°W	SC4991
Maughold Head	Isle of Man	54.29°N 04.31°W	SC494913
Maulden	Bedfordshire	52.03°N 00.47°W	TL0538
Maulds Meaburn	Cumbria	54.53°N 02.58°W	NY6216
Maunby	North Yorkshire	54.26°N 01.46°W	SE3586
Maund Bryan	Herefordshire	52.14°N 02.64°W	SO5650
Maundown	Somerset	51.04°N 03.34°W	ST0628
Mauricewood	Midlothian	55.83°N 03.23°W	NT2361
Mautby	Norfolk	52.64°N 01.66°E	TG4812
Mavesyn Ridware	Staffordshire	52.74°N 01.88°W	SK0816
Mavis Enderby	Lincolnshire	53.17°N 00.03°E	TF3666
Mawbray	Cumbria	54.80°N 03.43°W	NY0846
Mawdesley	Lancashire	53.62°N 02.77°W	SD4914
Mawdlam	Bridgend	51.51°N 03.73°W	SS8081
Mawgan or Mawgan-in-Meneage	Cornwall	50.08°N 05.21°W	SW7025
Mawgan Porth	Cornwall	50.46°N 05.03°W	SW8567
Maw Green	Cheshire	53.10°N 02.43°W	SJ7157
Mawla	Cornwall	50.26°N 05.22°W	SW7045
Mawnan	Cornwall	50.10°N 05.10°W	SW7827
Mawnan Smith	Cornwall	50.11°N 05.12°W	SW7728
Mawson Green	Doncaster	53.63°N 01.03°W	SE6416
Mawthorpe	Lincolnshire	53.22°N 00.17°E	TF4572
Maxey	Cambridgeshire	52.65°N 00.34°W	TF1208
Maxstoke	Warwickshire	52.47°N 01.66°W	SP2386
Maxted Street	Kent	51.15°N 01.03°E	TR1244
Maxton	Kent	51.11°N 01.28°E	TR3040
Maxton	Scottish Borders	55.56°N 02.61°W	NT6130
Maxwelltown	Dumfries and Galloway	55.05°N 03.62°W	NX9675
Maxworthy	Cornwall	50.70°N 04.47°W	SX2592
Mayals	Swansea	51.59°N 04.02°W	SS6090
May Bank	Staffordshire	53.02°N 02.22°W	SJ8547
Maybole	South Ayrshire	55.34°N 04.69°W	NS2909
Maybury	Surrey	51.31°N 00.55°W	TQ0158
Maybush	City of Southampton	50.92°N 01.46°W	SU3814
Mayer's Green	Sandwell	52.51°N 01.98°W	SP0191
Mayes Green	Surrey	51.13°N 00.40°W	TQ1239
Mayeston	Pembrokeshire	51.69°N 04.88°W	SN0103
Mayfair	City of Westminster	51.50°N 00.15°W	TQ2880
Mayfield	East Sussex	51.01°N 00.25°E	TQ5826
Mayfield	Highland	58.57°N 03.48°W	ND1466
Mayfield	Northumberland	55.07°N 01.57°W	NZ2776
Mayfield	Staffordshire	53.00°N 01.77°W	SK1545
Mayfield	Midlothian	55.86°N 03.04°W	NT3564
Mayfield	West Lothian	55.89°N 03.71°W	NS9368
Mayford	Surrey	51.29°N 00.58°W	SU9956
May Hill	Monmouthshire	51.80°N 02.71°W	SO5112
Mayhill	Swansea	51.62°N 03.96°W	SS6494
Mayland	Essex	51.67°N 00.76°E	TL9101
Maylandsea	Essex	51.68°N 00.74°E	TL9002
Maynard's Green	East Sussex	50.94600°N 0.25022°E	TQ5818
Mayon	Cornwall	50.06°N 05.70°W	SW3525
Mayplace	Bexley	51.459°N 00.166°E	TQ506756
Maypole	Isles of Scilly	49.91°N 06.29°W	SV9211
Maypole	Monmouthshire	51.84°N 02.77°W	SO4716
Maypole	London Borough of Bromley	51.34°N 00.13°E	TQ4963
Maypole (Dartford)	Kent	51.43°N 00.17°E	TQ5173
Maypole (Canterbury)	Kent	51.33°N 01.15°E	TR2064
Maypole Green	Norfolk	52.49°N 01.54°E	TM4195
Maypole Green (Dennington)	Suffolk	52.25°N 01.33°E	TM2767
Maypole Green (Bradfield St George)	Suffolk	52.19°N 00.79°E	TL9159
Maypole Green	Essex	51.86°N 00.87°E	TL9822
May's Green	Surrey	51.30°N 00.43°W	TQ0957
May's Green	North Somerset	51.36°N 02.87°W	ST3963
Mays Green	Oxfordshire	51.51°N 00.93°W	SU7480
Mayshill	South Gloucestershire	51.52°N 02.46°W	ST6881
Maythorn	Barnsley	53.54°N 01.72°W	SE1805
Maythorne	Nottinghamshire	53.08°N 00.97°W	SK6955
Maywick	Shetland Islands	60.00°N 01.33°W	HU3724
Maze Hill	Greenwich	51.481°N 0.004°E	TQ402780

== Mc ==
Location	Locality	Coordinates (links to map & photo sources)	OS grid reference
McArthur's Head	Argyll and Bute	55.75°N 06.06°W	NR453592
