= List of dialling codes in the United Kingdom =

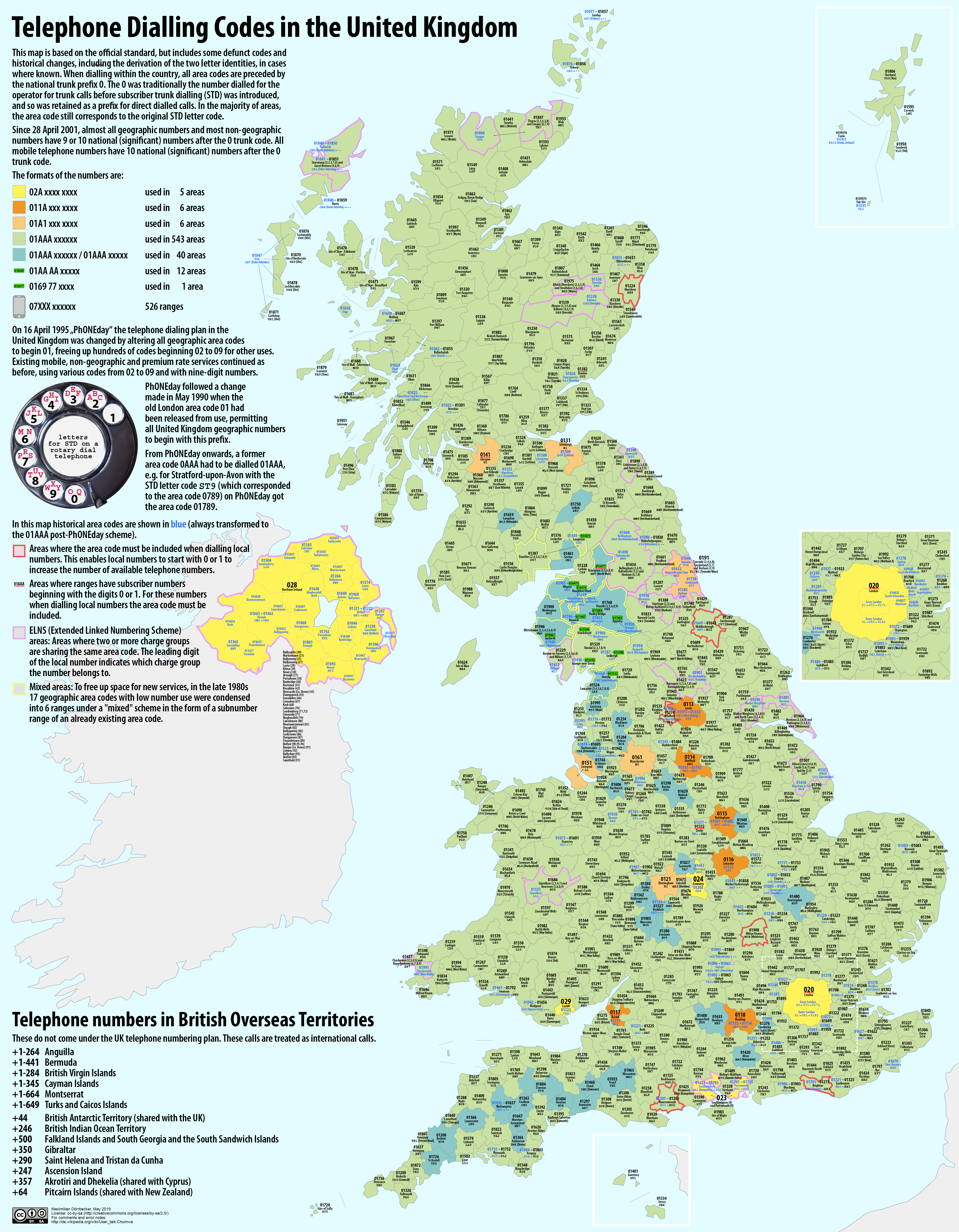
Map of telephone dialling codes in the United Kingdom and the Crown Dependencies, 2019

The United Kingdom and the Crown Dependencies have adopted an open telephone numbering plan in the public switched telephone network. The national telephone numbering plan is maintained by Ofcom, the regulator and competition authority for the UK communications industries. This list is based on the official standard, but includes defunct codes and historical changes, including the derivation of the two-letter identities, where known. Dialling codes do not correspond to political boundaries: for example, the Coventry dialling code covers a large area of Warwickshire, and the Manchester code covers part or all of several neighbouring towns.

When dialling within the country, all area codes are preceded by the national trunk prefix 0, which has been included in all listings in this article. 0 was traditionally the number dialled for the operator for long-distance calls before subscriber trunk dialling (STD) was introduced, and so was retained as a prefix for direct-dialled calls. In the majority of areas, the area code still corresponds to the original STD letter code. When dialling from abroad, the 0 prefix is not dialled. When dialling within the same area, the area code is not needed, save for a few areas that do require this. When calling from a mobile telephone or through a voice over IP service, the area code is always needed.

== Code prefixes ==
Initial digits	Service type
00	International call prefix
01	Geographic area codes since 1995
02	Geographic area codes since 2000
03	Non-geographic numbers charged at geographic rates
04	Reserved
05	Reserved (previously, corporate numbering and VoIP)
06	Reserved
07	Mobile telephony, paging services and personal numbering
08	Freephone and revenue share non-geographic numbers
09	Premium-rate services

== List of dialling codes ==
Short codes
02x yyyy yyyy [eight-digit local number]		011x yyy yyyy [seven-digit local number]		01x1 yyy yyyy [seven-digit local number]	
020 to 029		0113 to 0119		0121 to 0191	
020	London (Note: (020) The codes 0207 & 0208 do not exist: London is under a single code, 020. Local numbers have eight digits and currently begin 0, 3, 4, 7, or 8.) (previously 0171 and 0181) (Note: Area code changed as a part of the Big Number Change in 2000.) (previously 071 and 081) (Note: Area code changed as a part of phONEday in 1995.) (previously 01) (Note: Area code changed in 1990.)				
				0121	Birmingham (B1) (previously 021)
023	Southampton and Portsmouth (Note: (023) Wide area. Southampton numbers begin 80, 81, 82. Portsmouth numbers begin 92, 93, 94. Local numbers have eight digits.) (previously 01703 and 01705) (previously 0703 and 0705)	0113	Leeds (previously 0532)	0131	Edinburgh (E1) (previously 031)
024	Coventry (Note: (024) Wide area. Coventry numbers begin 75, 76, 77. Local numbers have eight digits.) (previously 01203) (previously 0203)	0114	Sheffield (previously 0742)	0141	Glasgow (G1) (previously 041)
		0115	Nottingham (previously 0602)	0151	Liverpool (L1) (previously 051)
		0116	Leicester (previously 0533)	0161	Manchester (M1) (previously 061)
		0117	Bristol (previously 0272)	0171	unused (was Inner London until 2000) (previously 071) (previously 01)
028	Northern Ireland (Note: (028) Eight-digit local numbers begin as follows: Ballycastle: 20, Martinstown: 21, Ballymena: 25, Ballymoney: 27, Larne: 28, Kilrea: 29, Newry: 30, Armagh: 37, Portadown: 38, Banbridge: 40, Rostrevor: 41, Kircubbin: 42, Newcastle (Co. Down): 43, Downpatrick: 44, Enniskillen: 66, Lisnaskea: 67, Kesh: 68, Coleraine: 70, Derry: 71, Limavady: 77, Magherafelt: 79, Carrickmore: 80, Newtownstewart: 81, Omagh: 82, Ballygawley: 85, Cookstown: 86, Dungannon: 87, Fivemiletown: 89, Belfast: 90 and 95, Bangor (Co. Down): 91, Lisburn: 92, Ballyclare: 93, Antrim: 94, Saintfield: 97. When dialling Northern Ireland from the Republic of Ireland, it may be cheaper to dial 048 xxxx xxxx rather than the normal 00 44 28 xxxx xxxx (see ComReg website).) (previously used multiple 01xxx and 01xxxx area codes until 2000) (previously used multiple 0xxx and 0xxxx area codes until 1995)	0118	Reading (Note: (0118) Numbers in Reading separately migrated to 0118 several years after PhONEday and a couple of years before the BigNumber change. Local numbers have seven digits and begin 2, 3, 4 or 9.) (previously 01734) (Note: Area code changed in 1998.) (previously 0734)	0181	unused (was Outer London until 2000) (previously 081) (previously 01)
029	Cardiff (Note: (029) Wide area. Cardiff numbers begin 20, 21, 22. Local numbers have eight digits.) (previously 01222) (previously 0222)			0191	Tyne & Wear and Durham, i.e., Tyneside, Sunderland, and Durham (Note: (0191) ELNS area. Tyneside numbers begin 2, 4, 6, 8 (North Tyneside/Newcastle 2, 6 – South Tyneside/Gateshead 4, 8). Durham numbers begin 3, 9. Sunderland numbers begin 5, 7. Local numbers have seven digits.) (previously 091)

For an explanation of the two-letter STD codes used below, see Introduction of area codes.

ELNS denotes Extended Linked Numbering Scheme areas, where an area code is associated with more than one place name.

Long codes
01xxx [mostly six-digit local numbers] (Note: There are some places with the standard (01xxx) four-digit area code but which have both six-digit and five-digit local numbers, as described at Telephone numbers in the United Kingdom. These codes include 01204, 01208, 01254, 01276, 01297, 01298, 01363, 01364, 01384, 01386, 01404, 01420, 01460, 01461, 01480, 01488, 01524 (mixed), 01527, 01562, 01566, 01606, 01629, 01635, 01647, 01659, 01695, 01726, 01744, 01750, 01768 (mixed), 01827, 01837, 01884, 01900, 01905, 01935, 01946 (mixed), 01949, 01963 and 01995.) and 01xxxx [mostly five-digit local numbers] (Note: There are some places with an (01xx xx) five-digit area code. These areas can potentially have either or both five-digit and four-digit local numbers. Nowadays only Brampton (0169 77) has four-digit local numbers (0169 77) 2xxx and (0169 77) 3xxx, as well as five-digit local numbers (0169 77) 4xxxx to (0169 77) 9xxxx, as described at Telephone numbers in the United Kingdom and at Ofcom. "Code and number blocks – 1600 00 to 1799 99". Office of Communication. Archived from the original on 18 September 2012.) (but not 01x1 codes)
01200 to 01470	01471 to 01762	01763 to 01999
01200 — Clitheroe (CO0); 01201 — unused; 0201 was Bournemouth (BO1) – numbers were transferred to 0202 (Note: This change happened prior to PhONEday (16 April 1995); the new code is not to be confused with the current allocations of dialling codes commencing 02 to 09, as this code would have changed again (mostly by adding the '1' after initial zero) on PhONEday.): 01202 — Bournemouth (BO2); 01203 — unused; was Coventry (CO3) – numbers were transferred to 024 on 22 April 2000: 01204 — Bolton (BO4); 01205 — Boston (BO5); 01206 — Colchester (CO6); 01207 — Consett (CO7); 01208 — Bodmin (BO8); 01209 — Redruth, Cornwall (CO9); 01210 – 01219; See 0121 — Birmingham (B1) – previously 021: 01220 — unused; 0220 was Cambridge (CA0) – numbers were transferred to 0223: 01221 — unused; 0221 was Bath (BA1) – numbers were transferred to 0225: 01222 — unused; was Cardiff (CA2) – numbers were transferred to 029 on 22 April 2000: 01223 — Cambridge (CA3); 01224 — Aberdeen (AB4); 01225 — Bath (BA5); 01226 — Barnsley (BA6); 01227 — Canterbury (CA7); 01228 — Carlisle (CA8); 01229 — Barrow-in-Furness and Millom (BA9) (Note: (01229) ELNS area. Barrow-in-Furness numbers begin 2, 4, 5, 6, 8. Millom numbers begin 3, 7, 9.); 01230 — unused; 0230 was Bedford (BE0) – numbers were transferred to 0234: 01231 — unused; 0231 was Belfast (BE1) – numbers were transferred to 0232: 01232 — unused; was Belfast (BE2) – numbers were transferred to 028 on 22 April 2000: 01233 — Ashford (Kent) (AD3); 01234 — Bedford (BE4); 01235 — Abingdon (AD5); 01236 — Coatbridge (CE6); 01237 — Bideford (BD7); 01238 — unused; was Saintfield, Belfast (BE) – numbers were transferred to 028 on 22 April 2000: 01239 — Cardigan (CD9); 01240 — unused; 0240 was Chiltern (CH0) – numbers were transferred to 0494: 01241 — Arbroath (AH1); 01242 — Cheltenham (CH2); 01243 — Chichester, West Sussex (CH3); 01244 — Chester (CH4); 01245 — Chelmsford (CH5); 01246 — Chesterfield (CH6); 01247 — unused; was Bangor, NI (BG7) (Note: (01247) Mixed area. Bangor numbers began 2, 3, 4, 5, 6, 8, 9 before 2000.) – numbers were transferred to 028 on 22 April 2000: 0124 77 — was Kircubbin (Note: All Northern Ireland 01xx xx "mixed" areas migrated to the new 028 area code in the Big Number Change in 2000.) – numbers were transferred to 028 on 22 April 2000; 01248 — Bangor (Gwynedd) (BG8); 01249 — Chippenham (CH9); 01250 — Blairgowrie (BL0); 01251 — unused; 0251 was Aldershot (AL1) – numbers were transferred to 0252: 01252 — Aldershot (AL2); 01253 — Blackpool (BL3); 01254 — Blackburn (BL4); 01255 — Clacton-on-Sea (CL5); 01256 — Basingstoke (BK6); 01257 — Coppull, Chorley (CL7); 01258 — Blandford (BL8); 01259 — Alloa (AL9); 01260 — Congleton (CN0); 01261 — Banff (BN1); 01262 — Bridlington (BN2); 01263 — Cromer (CM3); 01264 — Andover (AN4); 01265 — unused; was Coleraine (CN5) (Note: (01265) Mixed area. Coleraine numbers began 2, 3, 4, 5, 8, 9 before 2000.) – numbers were transferred to 028 on 22 April 2000: 0126 56 — was Ballymoney – numbers were transferred to 028 on 22 April 2000; 0126 57 — was Ballycastle – numbers were transferred to 028 on 22 April 2000; 01266 — unused; was Ballymena (BM6) (Note: (01266) Mixed area. Ballymena numbers began 2, 3, 4, 6, 8, 9 before 2000.) – numbers were transferred to 028 on 22 April 2000: 0126 65 — was Kilrea – numbers were transferred to 028 on 22 April 2000; 0126 67 — was Martinstown – numbers were transferred to 028 on 22 April 2000; 01267 — Carmarthen (CM7); 01268 — Basildon (BN8); 01269 — Ammanford (AM9); 01270 — Crewe (CR0); 01271 — Barnstaple (BP1); 01272 — unused; 0272 was Bristol (BR2) – numbers were transferred to 0117 on 16 April 1995: 01273 — Brighton (BR3); 01274 — Bradford (BR4); 01275 — Clevedon, Bristol (BR5); 01276 — Camberley (CR6); 0276 was originally intended also to cover Ascot (AS6) and Bracknell (BR6): 01277 — Brentwood (BR7); 01278 — Bridgwater (BR8); 01279 — Bishop's Stortford (BS9); 01280 — Buckingham (BU0); 01281 — unused; 0281 was Buckinghamshire (BU1) – numbers were transferred to 0753: 01282 — Burnley (BU2); 01283 — Burton upon Trent (BU3); 01284 — Bury St Edmunds (BU4); 01285 — Cirencester (CT5); 01286 — Caernarfon (CV6); CV was derived from Carnarvon, the English spelling of Caernarfon: 01287 — Guisborough, Cleveland (CV7); 01288 — Bude (BU8); 01289 — Berwick-upon-Tweed (BT9); 01290 — Cumnock, Ayrshire (AY0); 01291 — Chepstow (CW1); 01292 — Ayr (AY2); 01293 — Crawley (CY3); 01294 — Ardrossan, Ayrshire (AY4); 01295 — Banbury (BY5); 01296 — Aylesbury (AY6); 01297 — Axminster (AX7); 01298 — Buxton (BX8); 01299 — Bewdley (BY9); 01300 — Cerne Abbas, Dorset (DO0); 01301 — Arrochar – – Was originally 0022 (OC2) until changed to 0301 in 1968; 01302 — Doncaster (DO2); 01303 — Folkestone (FO3); 01304 — Dover (DO4); 01305 — Dorchester (DO5); 01306 — Dorking (DO6); 01307 — Forfar (FO7); 01308 — Bridport, Dorset (DO8); 01309 — Forres (FO9); 01310 – 01319; See 0131 — Edinburgh (E1) – previously 031: 01320 — Fort Augustus (FA0); 01321 — unused; 0321 was Eastbourne (EA1) – numbers were transferred to 0323 0321 later used for Vodafone freephone; changed from 0321 to 0808 0 on 28 April 2001: 01322 — Dartford (DA2); 01323 — Eastbourne (EA3); 01324 — Falkirk (FA4); 01325 — Darlington (DA5); 01326 — Falmouth (FA6); 01327 — Daventry (DA7); 01328 — Fakenham (FA8); 01329 — Fareham (FA9); 01330 — Banchory, Deeside (DE0); 01331 — unused; 0331 was Derby (DE1) – numbers were transferred to 0332 0331 later used for Premium rate numbers: 01332 — Derby (DE2); 01333 — Peat Inn, Fife (FF3); 01334 — St Andrews, Fife (FF4); 01335 — Ashbourne, Derbyshire (DE5); 01336 — unused; 0336 was Deeside (DE6) – numbers were transferred to 0975 (ELNS) 0336 7 later used for VodaPage pager numbers; changed from 0336 7 to 076 637 on 28 April 2001 0336 later used for Premium rate numbers; details of migration on 28 April 2001 are not available: 01337 — Ladybank, Fife (FF7); 01338 — unused; 0338 was Deeside (DE8) – numbers were transferred to 0339 (ELNS) 0338 later used for Mercury Premium rate numbers: 01339 — Aboyne and Ballater, Deeside (DE9) (Note: (01339) ELNS area. Aboyne numbers begin 2, 3, 5, 8. Ballater numbers begin 4, 6, 7, 9.); 01340 — Craigellachie, Elgin (EG0); 01341 — Barmouth, Dolgellau (DG1); 01342 — East Grinstead (EG2); 01343 — Elgin (EG3); 01344 — Bracknell, Easthampstead (EH4); 01345 — unused; 0345 was Huddersfield (??) – numbers were transferred to 0484 0345 later used for BT Lo-call; changed from 0345 to 0845 7 on 28 April 2001: 01346 — Fraserburgh (FH6); 01347 — Easingwold (EG7); 01348 — Fishguard (FG8); 01349 — Dingwall (DG9); 01350 — Dunkeld (DK0); 01351 — unused; 0351 was Fair Isle (FL1) – numbers were transferred to 0595: 01352 — Mold, Flint (FL2); 01353 — Ely (EL3); 01354 — Fenland, Cambridgeshire (FL4); 01355 — East Kilbride (EK5); 01356 — Brechin, Edzell (EL6); 01357 — Strathaven, East Kilbride (EK7); 01358 — Ellon (EL8); 01359 — Pakenham, Elmswell (EL9); 01360 — Killearn, Drymen (DM0); 01361 — Duns (DN1); 01362 — Dereham (DM2); 01363 — Crediton (CN3); 01364 — Ashburton, Devon (DN4); 01365 — unused; was Enniskillen (EN5) (Note: (01365) Mixed area. Enniskillen numbers began 2, 3, 4, 8, 9 before 2000.) – numbers were transferred to 028 on 22 April 2000: 0136 55 — was Fivemiletown – numbers were transferred to 028 on 22 April 2000; 0136 56 — was Kesh – numbers were transferred to 028 on 22 April 2000; 0136 57 — was Lisnaskea – numbers were transferred to 028 on 22 April 2000; 01366 — Downham Market (DM6); 01367 — Faringdon (FN7); 01368 — Dunbar (DN8); 01369 — Dunoon (DN9); 01370 — unused; 0370 was Hockley, Essex (ES0) – numbers were transferred to 0702 0370 later used for Vodafone mobile; changed from 0370 to 07770 on 22 April 2001: 01371 — Great Dunmow, Essex (ES1); 01372 — Esher (ES2); 01373 — Frome (FR3); 01374 — unused; 0374 was Basildon, Essex (ES4) – numbers were transferred to 0268 0374 later used for Vodafone mobile; changed from 0374 to 07774 on 22 April 2001 0374 5 later used for National rate; changed from 0374 5 to 0870 45 on 22 April 2001: 01375 — Grays Thurrock, Essex (ES5); 01376 — Braintree, Essex (ES6); 01377 — Driffield (DR7); 01378 — unused; 0378 was Epping (EP8) – numbers were transferred to 0992 0378 later used for Vodafone mobile; changed from 0378 to 07778 on 22 April 2001: 01379 — Diss (DS9); 01380 — Devizes (DV0); 01381 — Fortrose (FT1); 01382 — Dundee (DU2); 01383 — Dunfermline (DU3); 01384 — Dudley (DU4); 01385 — unused; 0385 was Durham (DU5) – numbers were transferred to 091 in the 1980s (Note: (0191) Numbers in Newcastle, Durham, Sunderland, Tyneside, and Wearside were migrated to 091, now 0191, between 1982 and 1988.) 0385 4 and 0385 6 later used for VoData pagers; details of migration on 28 April 2001 are not available 0385 later used for Vodafone mobile; changed from 0385 to 07785 on 28 April 2001: 01386 — Evesham (EV6); 01387 — Dumfries (DU7) (Note: (01387) Mixed area. Dumfries numbers begin 2, 4, 5, 6, 7, 8, 9.); 0138 73 — Langholm; 01388 — Bishop Auckland, Durham and Stanhope (Eastgate), Durham (DU8) (Note: (01388) ELNS area. Bishop Auckland numbers begin 3, 4, 6, 7, 8, 9. Stanhope (Eastgate) numbers begin 2, 5.); 01389 — Dumbarton (DU9); 01390 — unused; 0390 was Eyemouth (EY0) – numbers were transferred to 0890 (ELNS) 0390 later used for Orange mobile; changed from 0390 to 07790 on 28 April 2001: 01391 — unused; 0391 was Fylde (FY1) – numbers were transferred to 0253: 01392 — Exeter (EX2); 01393 — unused; 0393 3 was Foula, Zetland (FZ33) – numbers prefixed by 75 and transferred to 01595 on PhONE day: 01394 — Felixstowe (FX4); 01395 — Budleigh Salterton, Exmouth (EX5); 01396 — unused; was Downpatrick (DW6) (Note: (01396) Mixed area. Downpatrick numbers began 2, 3, 4, 5, 6, 8, 9 before 2000.) – numbers were transferred to 028 on 22 April 2000: 0139 67 — was Newcastle – numbers were transferred to 028 on 22 April 2000; 01397 — Fort William (FW7); 01398 — Dulverton, Exmoor (EX8); 01399 — unused; 0399 was Dawley (DY9) allocated to planned Telford new town, but numbers were instead allocated to 0952 0399 later used for Vodafone paging; changed from 0399 to 01399 in 1995 01399 later used for Vodafone paging; changed from 01399 to 076 99 on 28 April 2001 0399 later used for unknown services; changed from 0399 to 01399 in 1995 01399 later used for unknown services; changed from 01399 to 0845 4 on 28 April 2001: 01400 — Honington (HO0); 01401 — unused; 0401 was Hornsea (HO1) – numbers were transferred to 0964 (ELNS) 0401 later used for Cellnet mobile; changed from 0401 to 07701 on 28 April 2001: 01402 — unused; 0402 was not an area code on its own. 04022 was Upminster, 04023 was Ingrebourne, 04024 was Hornchurch (HO2), 04025 was South Ockendon, 04026 was Purfleet, 04027 was Rainham and 04028 was Stapleford Abbotts – numbers were transferred to 0708 (Note: Historical note: In fact 0402 was equivalent to 07088, and translated as such for call connection, but (say) 070884 xxxxx was too long a dial string for the numbering plan, so 04024 xxxxx was used.) 0402 later used for Cellnet mobile; changed from 0402 to 07702 on 28 April 2001: 01403 — Horsham (HO3); 0403 later used for Cellnet mobile; changed from 0403 to 07703 on 28 April 2001: 01404 — Honiton (HO4); 01405 — Goole (GO5); 01406 — Holbeach (HO6); 01407 — Holyhead (HO7); 01408 — Golspie (GO8); 0408 later used for BT mobile Personal Assistant; numbers discontinued on 28 April 2001: 01409 — Holsworthy (HO9); 01410 — See 0141 — Glasgow (G1) – previously 041; 0410 was later used for Cellnet mobile; changed from 0410 to 07710 on 28 April 2001: 01411 — See 0141 — Glasgow (G1) – previously 041; 0411 was later used for Cellnet mobile; changed from 0411 to 07711 on 28 April 2001: 01412 – 01419; See 0141 — Glasgow (G1) – previously 041: 01420 — Alton, Hampshire (HA0); 01421 — unused; 0421 was Southampton, Hampshire (HA1) – numbers were transferred to 0703 0421 later used for Vodafone mobile; changed from 0421 to 07721 on 28 April 2001: 01422 — Halifax (HA2); 01423 — Boroughbridge and Harrogate (HA3) (Note: (01423) ELNS area. Boroughbridge numbers begin 3, 4, 9. Harrogate numbers begin 2, 5, 6, 7, 8.); 01424 — Hastings (HA4); 01425 — Ringwood, New Milton and Highcliffe, Hampshire (HA5); 01426 — unused; 0426 was Hastings (HA6) allocated but never used, all numbers were on 0424 0426 later used for BT Paging; changed from 0426 to 01426 in 1995 01426 later used for BT Paging; changed from 01426 to 076 26 on 28 April 2001: 01427 — Gainsborough (GA7); 01428 — Haslemere (HA8); 01429 — Hartlepool (HA9); 01430 — Market Weighton and North Cave, Howden (HD0) (Note: (01430) ELNS area. Market Weighton numbers begin 6, 7, 8, 9. North Cave numbers begin 2, 3, 4, 5.); 01431 — Helmsdale (HE1); 01432 — Hereford (HE2); 0432 5 later used for BT paging; changed from 0432 5 to 076 25 on 28 April 2001: 01433 — Hathersage (HE3); 01434 — Bellingham, Haltwhistle and Hexham (HE4) (Note: (01434) ELNS area. Bellingham numbers begin 2, 4, 9. Haltwhistle numbers begin 3, 5. Hexham numbers begin 6, 7, 8.); 01435 — Heathfield (HE5); 01436 — Helensburgh (HE6); 01437 — Clynderwen (Clunderwen) and Haverfordwest (HF7) (Note: (01437) ELNS area. Clynderwen (Clunderwen) numbers begin 2, 3, 4, 5. Haverfordwest numbers begin 6, 7, 8, 9.); 01438 — Stevenage, Hertfordshire (HE8); 01439 — Helmsley (HE9); 01440 — Haverhill (HH0); 01441 — unused; 0441 was Swansea, Glamorgan (GG1) – numbers were transferred to 0792 0441 later used for Vodafone mobile; changed from 0441 to 07741 on 28 April 2001: 01442 — Hemel Hempstead (HH2); 01443 — Pontypridd, Glamorgan (GG3); 01444 — Haywards Heath (HH4) (also covers Burgess Hill); 01445 — Gairloch (GH5); 01446 — Barry, Glamorgan (GG6); 01447 — unused; 0447 was Cardiff, Glamorgan (GG7) – numbers were transferred to 0222 0(1?)447 later used for Kingston Communications Premium Rate changed from 0(1?)447 to 0xxx on 28 April 2001: 01448 — unused; 0448 was Grange-over-Sands (GG8) – numbers were transferred to 05395 (mixed) 04481 later used for mobile; changed from 04481 to 07781 on 28 April 2001: 01449 — Stowmarket, Gipping (GG9); 01450 — Hawick (HK0); 01451 — Stow-on-the-Wold, Gloucestershire (GL1); 01452 — Gloucester (GL2); 01453 — Dursley, Gloucestershire (GL3); 01454 — Chipping Sodbury, Gloucestershire (GL4); 01455 — Hinckley (HK5); 01456 — Glenurquhart (GL6); 0456 0 and 0456 1 later used for Orange mobile; changed from 0456 to unknown on 28 April 2001: 01457 — Glossop (GL7), Saddleworth; 01458 — Glastonbury (GL8); 01459 — unused; original area allocation unknown 0459 later used for Mercury/PageOne and VodaPage paging; changed from 0459 to 01459 in 1995 01459 (2,9) later used for Mercury/PageOne paging; changed from 01459 to 076 59 on 28 April 2001 01459 (3-8) later used for VodaPage paging; changed from 01459 to 076 59 on 28 April 2001: 01460 — Chard, Ilminster (IM0); 01461 — Gretna (GN1); 01462 — Hitchin (HN2); 04624 later used for Isle of Man mobile; changed from 04624 to 07624 on 28 April 2001: 01463 — Inverness (IN3); 01464 — Insch (IN4); 01465 — Girvan (GN5); 01466 — Huntly (HN6); 01467 — Inverurie (IN7); 0467 later used for Vodafone mobile; changed from 0467 to 07767 on 28 April 2001: 01468 — unused; 0468 was Ingleborough (IN8) – numbers were transferred to 05242 (mixed) 0468 later used for Vodafone mobile; changed from 0468 to 07768 on 29 April 2001: 01469 — Killingholme, Immingham (IM9); 01470 — Edinbane, Isle of Skye (IS0)	01471 — Broadford, Isle of Skye (IS1); 01472 — Grimsby (GR2); 01473 — Ipswich (IP3); 01474 — Gravesend (GR4); 01475 — Greenock (GR5); 01476 — Grantham (GR6); 01477 — Holmes Chapel (HS7); 01478 — Portree, Isle of Skye (IS8); 01479 — Grantown-on-Spey (GR9); 01480 — Huntingdon (HU0); 01481 — Guernsey (GU1); 01482 — Hull (HU2); 01483 — Guildford (GU3); 01484 — Huddersfield (HU4); 01485 — Hunstanton (HU5); 01486 — unused; 0486 was Guildford (GU6) – numbers were transferred to 0483: 01487 — Warboys, Huntingdon (HU7); 01488 — Hungerford (HU8); 01489 — Bishop's Waltham, Hamble Valley (HV9); 01490 — Corwen, Gwynedd (GW0); 01491 — Henley-on-Thames (HY1); 01492 — Colwyn Bay, Gwynedd (GW2); 01493 — Great Yarmouth (GY3); 01494 — High Wycombe (HW4); 01495 — Pontypool, Gwent (GW5); 01496 — Port Ellen, Islay (IY6); 01497 — Hay-on-Wye (HW7); 01498 — unused; 0498 was Haltwhistle (HW8) – numbers were transferred to 0434 (ELNS) 0498 later used for Vodafone mobile; changed from 0498 to 07798 on 28 April 2001: 01499 — Inveraray (IY9); 01500 — unused; 0500 was Edinburgh, Lothian (LO0) – numbers were transferred to 031 0500 was later used for 9-digit C&WC FreeCall numbers. New numbers were not allocated after 28 April 2001, although numbers active before that date remained in use until the range was shut down in July 2017: 01501 — Harthill, Lothian (LO1); 01502 — Lowestoft (LO2); 01503 — Looe (LO3); 01504 — unused; was Derry (LO4) (Note: (01504) Mixed area. Londonderry numbers began 2, 3, 4, 5, 6, 8, 9 before 2000.) – numbers were transferred to 028 on 22 April 2000: 0150 47 — was Limavady – numbers were transferred to 028 on 22 April 2000; 01505 — Johnstone (JO5); 01506 — Bathgate, Lothian (LO6); 01507 — Alford (Lincs), Louth and Spilsby (LO7) (Note: (01507) ELNS area. Alford (Lincs) numbers begin 4, 8, 9. Louth numbers begin 3, 6, 7. Spilsby numbers begin 2, 5.); 01508 — Brooke and Loddon, Norfolk (LO8); 01509 — Loughborough (LO9); 01510 – 01519; See 0151 — Liverpool (L1)– previously 051: 01520 — Lochcarron (LC0); 01521 — unused; 0521 was Alford, Lincolnshire (LC1) – numbers were transferred to 0507 (ELNS): 01522 — Lincoln (LC2); 01523 — unused; 0523 was Wigan, Lancashire (LA3) – numbers were transferred to 0942 0523 later used for PageOne paging; changed from 0523 to 01523 in 1995 01523 later used for PageOne paging; changed from 01523 to 076 23 on 28 April 2001: 01524 — Cumbria (Arnside, Burton-in-Kendal area), North Yorkshire (including Bentham and surrounding areas) and a majority of North Lancashire including Lancaster (LA4) (Note: (01524) Mixed area. Lancaster numbers begin 3, 4, 5, 6, 7, 8, 9.); 0152 42 — Hornby-with-Farleton; 01525 — Leighton Buzzard (LB5); 01526 — Martin, Lincolnshire (LC6); 01527 — Redditch, Lapworth (LA7) – – Was originally 0739 (RE9) until changed to 0527 in ??; 01528 — Laggan, Badenoch (LA8); 01529 — Sleaford, Lincolnshire (LC9); 01530 — Coalville, Ashby-de-la-Zouch Leicestershire (LE0); 01531 — Ledbury (LE1); 01532 — unused; 0532 was Leeds (LE2) – numbers were transferred to 0113 on 16 April 1995: 01533 — unused; 0533 was Leicester (LE3) – numbers were transferred to 0116 on 16 April 1995: 01534 — Jersey (JE4); 01535 — Keighley (KE5); 01536 — Kettering (KE6); 01537 — unused; 0537 was Leicester (LE7) – numbers were transferred to 0533: 01538 — Ipstones, Leek (LE8); 01539 — Kendal (KE9) (Note: (01539) Mixed area. Kendal numbers begin 2, 3, 7, 8, 9.); 0153 94 — Hawkshead; 0153 95 — Grange-over-Sands; 0153 96 — Sedbergh; 01540 — Kingussie (KG0); 01541 — unused; 0541 was Langholm (LH1) – numbers were transferred to 03873 (mixed) 0541 later used for C&WC AreaCall; changed from 0541 to 0870 1 on 28 April 2001: 01542 — Keith (KH2); 01543 — Cannock, Lichfield (LH3); 01544 — Kington (KG4); 01545 — Llanarth (LH5); 01546 — Lochgilphead (LG6); 01547 — Knighton (KG7); 01548 — Kingsbridge (KG8); 01549 — Lairg (LG9); 01550 — Llandovery (LL0); 01551 — unused; 0551 was Llanidloes (LL1) – numbers were transferred to 0686 (ELNS): 01552 — unused; 0552 was Hamilton, Lanarkshire (LK2) – numbers were transferred to 0698: 01553 — King's Lynn (KL3); 01554 — Llanelli (LL4); 01555 — Lanark (LK5); 01556 — Castle Douglas, Kirkcudbrightshire (KK6); 01557 — Kirkcudbright (KK7); 01558 — Llandeilo (LL8); 01559 — Llandysul (LL9); 01560 — Moscow (Kilmarnock-dependent) (KM0); 01561 — Laurencekirk (LN1); 01562 — Kidderminster (KM2); 01563 — Kilmarnock (KM3); 01564 — Lapworth, Knowle (KN4); 01565 — Knutsford (KN5); 01566 — Launceston (LN6); 01567 — Killin (KN7); 01568 — Leominster (LM8); 01569 — Stonehaven, Kincardineshire (KN9); 01570 — Lampeter (LR0); 01571 — Lochinver (LR1); 01572 — Oakham – – Was originally 0023 (OA3) until changed to 0572 in 1968; 01573 — Kelso (KS3); 01574 — unused; was Larne (LR4) – numbers were transferred to 028 on 22 April 2000: 01575 — Kirriemuir (KR5); 01576 — Lockerbie (LR6); 01577 — Kinross (KS7); 01578 — Lauder (LR8); 01579 — Liskeard (LS9); 01580 — Cranbrook, Kent (KT0); 01581 — New Luce, Luce (LU1); 01582 — Luton (LU2); 01583 — Carradale, Kintyre (KT3); 01584 — Ludlow (LU4); 01585 — was Kesgrave (KV5); allocated but never used; all numbers were on 0473 Used up to the 1960s for internal telephones in the London Kingsway tunnels (LTK), numbers were reachable on both 0585 and 01-585. 0585 later used for Cellnet mobile; changed from 0585 to 07885 on 28 April 2001: 01586 — Campbeltown, Kintyre (KT6); 01587 — unused; 0587 was Sedbergh, Lune (LU7) – numbers were transferred to 05396 (mixed): 01588 — Bishop's Castle, Ludlow (LU8); 01589 — unused; 0589 was Livingston (LV9) – numbers were transferred to 0506 0589 later used for Cellnet mobile; changed from 0589 to 07789 on 28 April 2001: 01590 — Lymington (LY0); 01591 — Llanwrtyd Wells (LW1); 01592 — Kirkcaldy (KY2); 01593 — Lybster (LY3); 01594 — Lydney (LY45); 01595 — Lerwick, Foula and Fair Isle (LW5) (Note: (01595) Lerwick numbers begin 2, 3, 4, 5, 6, 70, 71, 72, 73, 74, 77, 78, 79, 8, 9. Foula numbers begin 75. Fair Isle numbers begin 76.); 01596 — unused; 0596 was Keswick (KW6) – numbers were transferred to 07687 (mixed): 01597 — Llandrindod Wells (LW7); 01598 — Lynton (LY8); 01599 — Kyle (KY90); 01600 — Monmouth (MO0); 01601 — unused; 0601 was Northampton (NO1) – numbers were transferred to 0604: 01602 — unused; 0602 was Nottingham (NO2) – numbers were transferred to 0115 on 16 April 1995: 01603 — Norwich (NO3); 01604 — Northampton (NO4); 01605 — unused; 0605 was Norwich (NO5) – numbers were transferred to 0603: 01606 — Northwich (NO6), Winsford; 01607 — unused; 0607 was Nottingham (NO7) – numbers were transferred to 0602: 01608 — Chipping Norton (NO8); 01609 — Northallerton (NO9); 01610 – 01619; See 0161 — Manchester (M1) – previously 061: 01620 — North Berwick (NB0); 01621 — Maldon (MA1); 01622 — Maidstone (MA2); 01623 — Mansfield (MA3); 01624 — Isle of Man (MA4); 01625 — Macclesfield (MA5); 01626 — Newton Abbot (NA6); 01627 — unused; 0627 was Maidstone (MA7) – numbers were transferred to 0622: 01628 — Maidenhead (MA8); 01629 — Matlock (MA9); 01630 — Market Drayton (MD0); 01631 — Oban – – Was originally 0024 (OB4) until changed to 0631 in 1968; 01632 — unused; 0632 was Newcastle upon Tyne (NE2) – numbers were transferred to 091 in the 1980s 0632 later used for Premium rate numbers; changed from 0632 to 09xx on 28 April 2001 Some 01632 numbers are reserved for use as fictional numbers for drama purposes: 01633 — Newport (NE3); 01634 — Medway (ME4); 01635 — Newbury (NE5); 01636 — Newark-on-Trent (NE6); 01637 — Newquay (NE7); 01638 — Newmarket (NE8); 01639 — Neath (NE9); 01640 — unused; 0640 was Mallaig (MG0) – numbers were transferred to 0687 0640 later used for Mercury Premium rate numbers; changed from 0640 to 09xx on 28 April 2001: 01641 — Strathy, Melvich (MH1); 01642 — Middlesbrough (MI2); 01643 — Minehead (MH3); 01644 — New Galloway (NG4); 01645 — unused; 0645 was Market Harborough (MH5) – numbers were transferred to 0858 0645 later used for C&WC LocalCall; changed from 0645 to 0845 9 on 28 April 2001: 01646 — Milford Haven (MH6); 01647 — Moretonhampstead (MH7); 01648 — unused; was Magherafelt (MG8) (Note: (01648) Mixed area. Magherafelt numbers began 2, 3, 4, 5, 6, 8, 9 before 2000.) – numbers were transferred to 028 on 22 April 2000: 0164 87 — was Cookstown – numbers were transferred to 028 on 22 April 2000; 01649 — unused; 0649 was Middlesbrough (MH9) – numbers were transferred to 0642: 01650 — Cemmaes Road, Machynlleth (ML0); 01651 — Oldmeldrum – – Was originally 0055 (OL5) until changed to 0651 in 1968; 01652 — Brigg, North Kelsey (NK2); 01653 — Malton (ML3); 01654 — Machynlleth (ML4); 01655 — Maybole (ML5); 01656 — Bridgend, Ogmore Vale – – Was originally 0042 (OG2) until changed to 0656 in 1968; 01657 — unused; 0657 was Millom (ML7) – numbers were transferred to 0229 (ELNS): 01658 — unused; 0658 was Mareham le Fen (ML8) – numbers were transferred to 0507 (ELNS): 01659 — Sanquhar, Nithsdale (NL9); 01660 — unused; 0660 was Bellingham, Northumberland (NM0) – numbers were transferred to 0434 (ELNS) 0660 later used for PageOne pager numbers; changed from 0660 to 076 61 on 28 April 2001 0660 later used for Mercury Premium rate numbers; changed from 0660 to 09xx on 28 April 2001: 01661 — Prudhoe, Northumberland (NM1); 01662 — unused; was Omagh (Note: (01662) Mixed area. Omagh numbers began 2, 3, 4, 8, 9 before 2000.) – – Was originally 0063 (OM3) until changed to 0662 in 1968 – numbers were transferred to 028 on 22 April 2000: 0166 25 — was Ballygawley – numbers were transferred to 028 on 22 April 2000; 0166 26 — was Newtownstewart – numbers were transferred to 028 on 22 April 2000; 0166 27 — was Carrickmore – numbers were transferred to 028 on 22 April 2000; 01663 — New Mills (NM3); 01664 — Melton Mowbray (MM4); 01665 — Alnwick, Northumberland (NM5); 01666 — Malmesbury (MM6); 01667 — Nairn (NN7); 01668 — Bamburgh, Northumberland (NM8); 01669 — Rothbury, Northumberland (NM9); 01670 — Morpeth (MP0); 01671 — Newton Stewart (NS1); 01672 — Marlborough (MR2); 01673 — Market Rasen (MR3); 01674 — Montrose (MR4); 01675 — Coleshill, Warwickshire, Meriden (MR5); 01676 — Meriden (MR6); 01677 — Bedale, North Riding (NR7); 01678 — Bala, Meirionydd (MR8); 01679 — unused; 0679 was New Romney (NR9) – numbers were transferred to 0797: 01680 — Craignure, Isle of Mull (MU0); 01681 — Fionnphort, Isle of Mull (MU1); 01682 — unused; 0682 was Nuneaton (NU2) – numbers were transferred to 0203 in 1982 before changing to 01203 in 1995 and to 024 on 22 April 2000: 01683 — Moffat (MT3); 01684 — Malvern (MV4); 01685 — Merthyr Tydfil (MT5); 01686 — Llanidloes and Newtown (NT6) (Note: (01686) ELNS area. Llanidloes numbers begin 2, 3, 4, 7. Newtown numbers begin 5, 6, 8, 9.); 01687 — Mallaig – – Was originally 0640 (MG7) until changed to 0687 in ??; 01688 — Tobermory, Isle of Mull (MU8); 01689 — Orpington (OT9) – – Was originally 0072 (OR2) until changed to 0689 in 1968; 01690 — Betws-y-Coed, North Wales (NW0); 01691 — Oswestry (OW1) – – Was originally 0073 (OS) until changed to 0691 in 1968; 01692 — North Walsham (NW2); 01693 — unused; was Newry (NY3) (Note: (01693) Mixed area. Newry numbers began 2, 3, 4, 5, 6, 8, 9 before 2000.) – numbers were transferred to 028 on 22 April 2000: 0169 37 — was Rostrevor – numbers were transferred to 028 on 22 April 2000; 01694 — Church Stretton, Mynd (MY4); 01695 — Skelmersdale/Ormskirk – – Ormskirk was originally 0074 (OR4) until changed to 0695 in 1968; 01696 — unused; was Market Weighton (MW6) – numbers were transferred to 0430 (ELNS) 0696 later used for Premium rate numbers; changed from 0696 to 09xx on 28 April 2001 Allocations included: 0696 6 – Jersey Telecoms, 0696 8 – Manx Telecoms and 0696 9 – Guernsey Telecoms: 01697 — Brampton (Note: (01697) Mixed area. Brampton six-figure numbers begin 2, 5, 6, 8, 9.) – disputed name — North West (NW); 0169 73 — Wigton; 0169 74 — Raughton Head; 0169 77 — Brampton; 01698 — Motherwell (MW8); 01699 — unused; 0699 was North West (NW9) – Armathwaite, Caldbeck, Raughton Head, Southwaite – numbers were transferred to 06974 (mixed): 01700 — Rothesay (RO0); 01701 — unused; 0701 was Portsmouth (PO1) – numbers were transferred to 0705: 01702 — Southend-on-Sea (SO2); 01703 — unused; was Southampton (SO3) – numbers were transferred to 023 on 22 April 2000: 01704 — Southport (SO4); 01705 — unused; was Portsmouth (PO5) – numbers were transferred to 023 on 22 April 2000: 01706 — Rochdale, Rossendale & Shaw (RO6); 01707 — Welwyn Garden City and Potters Bar (PO7); 01708 — Romford (RO8); 01709 — Rotherham (RO9); 01710–01719 — unused; Previously 0171 — Inner London (now 020) – previously 071: 01720 — Isles of Scilly (SC0); 01721 — Peebles (PB1); 01722 — Salisbury (SA2); 01723 — Scarborough (SC3); 01724 — Scunthorpe (SC4); 01725 — Rockbourne (RB5); 01726 — St Austell (SA6); 01727 — St Albans (SA7); 01728 — Saxmundham (SA8); 01729 — Settle, Ribblesdale (RB9); 01730 — Petersfield (PE0); 01731 — unused; 0731 was Peterborough (PE1) – numbers were transferred to 0733: 01732 — Sevenoaks (SE2); 01733 — Peterborough (PE3); 01734 — unused; was Reading (RE4) – numbers were transferred to 0118 on 9 January 1998: 01735 — unused; 0735 was Reading (RE5) – numbers were transferred to 0734: 01736 — Penzance (PE6); 01737 — Redhill (RE7); 01738 — Perth (PE8); 01739 — unused; 0739 was Redditch (RE9) – numbers were transferred to 0527: 01740 — Sedgefield (SG0); 01741 — unused; 0741 was Sheffield (SH1) – numbers were transferred to 0742: 01742 — unused; 0742 was Sheffield (SH2) – numbers were transferred to 0114 on 19 April 1995: 01743 — Shrewsbury (SH3); 01744 — St Helens (SH4); 01745 — Rhyl (RH5); 01746 — Bridgnorth, Shropshire (SH6); 01747 — Shaftesbury (SH7); 01748 — Richmond (RH8); 01749 — Shepton Mallet (SH9); 01750 — Selkirk (SK0); 01751 — Pickering (PK1); 01752 — Plymouth (PL2); 01753 — Slough (SL3); 01754 — Skegness (SK4); 01755 — unused; 0755 was Plymouth (PL5) – numbers were transferred to 0752 07555 was Saltash with a 4 digit number, integrated to 0752 84XXXX c.1989: 01756 — Skipton (SK6); 01757 — Selby (SL7); 01758 — Pwllheli (PL8); 01759 — Pocklington (PK9); 01760 — Swaffham (SM0); 01761 — Temple Cloud, Somerset (SM1); 01762 — unused; was Portadown (PN2) – numbers were transferred to 028 on 22 April 2000	01763 — Royston (RN3); 01764 — Crieff, Ruthven (RN4); 01765 — Ripon (RN5); 01766 — Porthmadog (PM6); 01767 — Sandy (SN7); 01768 — Penrith (PN8) (Note: (01768) Mixed area. Penrith numbers begin 2, 5, 6, 8, 9.); 0176 83 — Appleby-in-Westmorland; 0176 84 — Pooley Bridge; 0176 87 — Keswick; 01769 — South Molton (SM9); 01770 — Isle of Arran (RR0); 01771 — Maud, Peterhead (PR1); 01772 — Preston (PR2); 01773 — Ripley (RP3); 01774 — unused; 0774 was Preston (PR4) – numbers were transferred to 0772: 01775 — Spalding (SP5); 01776 — Stranraer (SR6); 01777 — Retford (RR7); 01778 — Market Deeping/Bourne (Spalding-dependent) (SP8); 01779 — Peterhead (PR9); 01780 — Stamford (ST0); 01781 — unused; 0781 was Stoke-on-Trent (ST1) – numbers were transferred to 0782: 01782 — Stoke-on-Trent (ST2); 01783 — unused; 0783 was Sunderland (SU3) – numbers were transferred to 091 in the 1980s: 01784 — Staines (ST4); 01785 — Stafford (ST5); 01786 — Stirling (ST6); 01787 — Sudbury (SU7); 01788 — Rugby (RU8); 01789 — Stratford-upon-Avon (ST9); 01790 — Spilsby (SY0); 01791 — unused; 0791 was Brighton, Sussex (SX1) – numbers were transferred to 0273: 01792 — Swansea (SW2); 01793 — Swindon (SW3); 01794 — Romsey (RY4); 01795 — Sittingbourne, Swale (SW5); 01796 — Pitlochry (PY6); 01797 — Rye (RY7); 01798 — Pulborough, Sussex (SX8); 01799 — Saffron Walden (SW9); 01800 — unused; 0800 was Tongue (TO0) – numbers were transferred to 0847 (ELNS) 0800 later used for BT Freefone numbers - usage of BT 9-digit 0800 numbers continued after the Big Number Change; all new 0800 allocations have 10 digits and multiple operators now issue 0800 numbers: 01801 — unused; 0801 was Thrapston, Oundle – – Was originally 0085 (OU5) until changed to 0801 in 1968 – numbers were transferred to 0832: 01802 — unused; original area allocation unknown 0802 later used for Cellnet mobile; changed from 0802 to 07802 on 28 April 2001: 01803 — Torquay (TO3); 01804 — unused; 0804 was Torquay (TO4) – numbers were transferred to 0803: 01805 — Torrington (TO5); 01806 — Voe, Shetland (VO6); 01807 — Ballindalloch, Tomintoul (TO7); 01808 — Tomatin (TO8); 01809 — Tomdoun (TO9); 01810–01819 — unused; Previously 0181 — Outer London (now 020) – previously 081: 01820 — unused; 0182 06 — was Banbridge – numbers were transferred to 028 on 22 April 2000; 01821 — Kinrossie, Tayside (TA1); 01822 — Tavistock (TA2); 01823 — Taunton (TA3); 01824 — Ruthin, Vale of Clwyd (VC4); 01825 — Uckfield (UC5); 01826 — unused; 0826 was Invergowrie, Tayside (TA6) – numbers were transferred to 0382: 01827 — Tamworth (TA7); 01828 — Coupar Angus, Tayside (TA8); 01829 — Tarporley (TA9); 01830 — Kirkwhelpington, Otterburn – – Was originally 0086 (OT) until changed to 0830 in 1968; 01831 — unused; original area allocation unknown 0831 later used for Vodafone mobile; changed from 0831 to 07831 on 28 April 2001: 01832 — Clopton, Oundle – – Was originally 0082 (OU) until changed to 0832 in 1968; 01833 — Barnard Castle, Teesdale (TE3); 01834 — Narberth, Tenby (TE4); 01835 — St Boswells, Teviotdale (TE5); 01836 — unused; 0836 was Eigg (??) – numbers were transferred to 0687 0836 later used for Vodafone mobile; changed from 0836 to 07836 on 28 April 2001 0836 later used for Premium rate services; changed from 0836 to unknown on 28 April 2001: 01837 — Okehampton – – Was originally 0052 (OK2) until changed to 0837 in 1968; 01838 — Dalmally, Tyndrum (TD8); 01839 — unused; original area allocation unknown - - Teesside? (TE9) 0839 later used for Vodafone mobile; changed from 0839 to 07839 on 28 April 2001 0839 later used for PageOne pager numbers; changed from 0839 to 076 61 on 28 April 2001 0839 later used for Mercury Premium rate services; changed from 0839 to unknown on 28 April 2001: 01840 — Camelford, Tintagel (TG0); 01841 — Padstow, Trevose Head (TH1); 01842 — Thetford (TH2); 01843 — Thanet (TH3); 01844 — Thame (TH4); 01845 — Thirsk (TH5); 01846 — unused; was Lisburn – numbers were transferred to 028 on 22 April 2000: 01847 — Thurso and Tongue (TH7) (Note: (01847) ELNS area. Thurso numbers begin 2, 3, 4, 5, 8. Tongue numbers begin 6, 7, 9.); 01848 — Thornhill (TH8); 01849 — unused; was Antrim – numbers were transferred to 028 on 22 April 2000: 01850 — unused; 0850 was Callanish, Lewis, Outer Hebrides – – Was originally 0040 (OH0) until changed to 0850 in 1968 – numbers were transferred to 0851 (ELNS) 0850 later used for Cellnet mobile; changed from 0850 to 07850 on 29 April 2001: 01851 — Great Bernera and Stornoway, Outer Hebrides (Note: (01851) ELNS area. Great Bernera numbers begin 4, 6, 9. Stornoway numbers begin 2, 3, 5, 7, 8.) – – Was originally 0041 (or 0044?) (OH1) until changed to 0851 in 1968; 01852 — Kilmelford, Oban – – Was originally 0025 (or 0026?) (OB5) until changed to 0852 in 1968; 01853 — unused; 0853 was Ullswater (UL3) – numbers were transferred to 07684 (mixed) 0853 later used for Premium rate numbers; changed from 0853 to 09xx on 28 April 2001: 01854 — Ullapool (UL4); 01855 — Ballachulish, Onich – – Was originally 0062 (ON2) until changed to 0855 in 1968; 01856 — Orkney – – Was originally 0076 (OR6) until changed to 0856 in 1968; 01857 — Sanday, Orkney – – Was originally 0077 (OR7) until changed to 0857 in 1968; 01858 — Market Harborough – – Was originally 0645 (MH5) until changed to 0858 around 1975; 01859 — Harris, Outer Hebrides – – Was originally 0046 (OH6) until changed to 0859 in 1968; 01860 — unused; original area allocation unknown 0860 later used for Cellnet mobile; changed from 0860 to 07860 on 28 April 2001: 01861 — unused; was Armagh – numbers were transferred to 028 on 22 April 2000: 01862 — Tain (TN2); 01863 — Bonar Bridge, (BB1); 01864 — Tinto, Abington (Crawford) (TN4); 01865 — Oxford, University (UN5) Was originally 0092 (OX2) until changed to 0865 (UN5[iversity]) in 1968; 01866 — Kilchrenan, Oban – – Was originally 0025 (OB5) until changed to 0866 in 1968; 01867 — unused; 0867 was Oxford – – Was originally 0096 (OX6) until changed to 0867 in 1968 – numbers were transferred to 0865: 01868 — unused; was Dungannon – numbers were transferred to 028 on 22 April 2000: 01869 — Bicester, Oxfordshire – – Was originally 0095 (OX5) until changed to 0869 in 1968; 01870 — Isle of Benbecula, Outer Hebrides, Uist (US0) – – Was originally 0047 (OH) until changed to 0870 in 1968; 01871 — Castlebay, Outer Hebrides – – Was originally 0047 (OH7) until changed to 0871 in 1968; 01872 — Truro (TR2); 01873 — Abergavenny, Usk (US3); 01874 — Brecon, Usk (US4); 01875 — Tranent (TR5); 01876 — Lochmaddy, Outer Hebrides, Uist (US6) – – Was originally 0047 (OH) until changed to 0876 in 1968; 01877 — Callander, Trossachs (TR7); 01878 — Lochboisdale, Outer Hebrides, Uist (US8) – – Was originally 0047 (OH) until changed to 0878 in 1968; 01879 — Scarinish, Tiree (TR9); 01880 — Tarbert (TT0); 01881 — unused; original area allocation unknown 0881 (0,4,8) later used for PageOne pager numbers; changed from 0881 to 076 81 on 28 April 2001 0881 (1-3,5-7,9) later used for Mercury Premium rate numbers; changed from 0881 to 09xx on 28 April 2001: 01882 — Kinloch Rannoch, Tummel Bridge (TU2); 01883 — Caterham, Oxted – – Was originally 0093 (OX3) until changed to 0883 in 1968; 01884 — Tiverton (TV4); 01885 — Pencombe, Teme Valley (TV5); 01886 — Bromyard, Teme Valley (TV6); 01887 — Aberfeldy, Tay Valley (TV7); 01888 — Turriff (TU8); 01889 — Rugeley, Trent Valley (TV9) (Uttoxeter (UT9) is a coincidental also-fit); 01890 — Ayton, Berwickshire and Coldstream, Tweed (TW0) (Note: (01890) ELNS area. Ayton numbers begin 5, 6, 7, 9. Coldstream numbers begin 2, 3, 4, 8.); 0890 later used for Premium rate numbers; changed from 0890 to 09xx on 28 April 2001: 01891 — unused; original area allocation unknown 0891 later used for BT ValueCall Premium rate numbers; changed from 0891 to 0906 5 on 28 April 2001: 01892 — Tunbridge Wells (TW2); 01893 — unused; original area allocation unknown 0893 later used for BT Paging; changed from 0893 to 01893 in 1995 01893 later used for BT Paging; changed from 01893 to 076 93 on 28 April 2001: 01894 — unused; 0894 was Tyneside (TY4) – numbers were transferred to 0632 and then on to 091 during the 1980s 0894 later used for BT Premium rate numbers; changed from 0894 to 09xx on 28 April 2001: 01895 — Uxbridge (UX5); 0895 later used for Premium rate numbers; changed from 0895 to 09xx on 28 April 2001: 01896 — Galashiels, Tweed (TW6); 0896 later used for Premium rate numbers; changed from 0896 to 09xx on 28 April 2001: 01897 — unused; 0897 was never used as an area code 0897 later used for BT Premium rate numbers; changed from 0897 to 09xx on 28 April 2001: 01898 — unused; original area allocation unknown 0898 later used for BT Premium rate numbers; changed from 0898 to 09xx on 28 April 2001: 01899 — Biggar, Tweed (TW9); 01900 — Workington (WO0); 01901 — unused; 0901 was Boroughbridge, Yorkshire (YO1) – numbers were transferred to 0423 (ELNS): 01902 — Wolverhampton (WO2); 01903 — Worthing (WO3); 01904 — York (YO4); 01905 — Worcester (WO5); 01906 — unused; 0906 was Worthing (WO6) – numbers were transferred to 0903: 01907 — unused; 0907 was Wolverhampton (WO7) – numbers were transferred to 0902: 01908 — Milton Keynes (originally Wolverton (WO8)); 01909 — Worksop (WO9); 01910 – 01919; See 0191 — Tyne and Wear, Sunderland (tY1neside) and Durham – previously 091 The 091 area was formed in the 1980s by the amalgamation of the older 0632, 0385, 0894, and 0783 area codes: 01920 — Ware (WA0); 01921 — unused; original area allocation unknown: 01922 — Walsall (WA2); 01923 — Watford (WA3); 01924 — Wakefield and Dewsbury (WA4); 01925 — Warrington (WA5); 01926 — Warwick (WA6); 01927 — unused; 0927 was Watford (WA7) – numbers were transferred to 0923: 01928 — Runcorn, Warrington (WA8); 01929 — Wareham (WA9); 01930 — unused; 0930 was Brough, Westmorland (WE0) – numbers were transferred to 07683 (mixed) 0930 later used for Premium rate numbers; changed from 0930 to 09xx on 28 April 2001 0930 7 later used for One2One Mobile (and mirrored to 0961 7); (Note: Historical note: 0930 was a Premium rate number range, however 0930 7 was used by One2One mobile phones. Where switchboards blocked 0930 as Premium rate, the mobile phones could not be contacted. 0961 7 was mirrored onto this allocation to get round the problem.) changed from 0930 7 to 07930 7 on 28 April 2001: 01931 — Shap, Westmorland (WE1); 01932 — Weybridge (WE2); 01933 — Wellingborough (WE3); 01934 — Weston-super-Mare (WE4); 01935 — Yeovil (YE5); 01936 — unused; 0936 was Weaver (WE6) – numbers were transferred to 0270: 01937 — Wetherby (WE7); 01938 — Welshpool (WE8); 01939 — Wem (WE9); 01940 — unused; 0940 was Gosforth, Whitehaven (WH0) – numbers were transferred to 09467 (mixed): 01941 — unused; original area allocation unknown 0941 later used for Premium rate numbers (Orange HPL pagers); changed from 0941 to 076 41 on 28 April 2001: 01942 — Wigan (WG2); 01943 — Guiseley, Wharfedale (WH3); 01944 — West Heslerton (WH4); 01945 — Wisbech (WH5); 01946 — Whitehaven (WH6) (Note: (01946) Mixed area. Whitehaven numbers begin 2, 3, 4, 5, 6, 8, 9.); 0194 67 — Gosforth; 01947 — Whitby (WH7); 01948 — Whitchurch (WH8); 01949 — Whatton (WH9); 01950 — Sandwick, Yell (YL0); 01951 — Colonsay (colonsaY1); 01952 — Telford, Wellington (WL2); 01953 — Wymondham, Wicklewood (WL3); 01954 — Madingley, Willingham (WL4); 01955 — Wick (WK5); 01956 — unused; 0956 was Weardale (WL6) – numbers were transferred to 0388 (ELNS) 0956 later used for One2One mobile; changed 0956 to 07956 on 28 April 2001 0956 7 later used for FleXtel personal numbering from 1994; changed from 0956 7 to 070 107 on 28 April 2001: 01957 — Mid Yell, Yell (YL7); 01958 — unused; 0958 was Aysgarth, Wensleydale (WL8) – numbers were transferred to 0969 0958 later used for One2One mobile; changed from 0958 to 07958 on 28 April 2001: 01959 — Westerham, Otford, West Kent (WK9) – – Was originally 0083 (OT) until changed to 0959 in 1968; 01960 — unused; was Ballyclare – numbers were transferred to 028 on 22 April 2000: 01961 — unused; original area allocation unknown 0961 later used for One2One mobile; changed from 0961 to 07961 on 28 April 2001 0961 7 was a mirror of 0930 7 (also One2One mobile); changed from 0930 7 to 07930 7 on 28 April 2001: 01962 — Winchester (WN2); 01963 — Wincanton (WN3); 01964 — Hornsea and Patrington, Withernsea (WN4) (Note: (01964) ELNS area. Hornsea numbers begin 2, 5, 8, 9. Patrington numbers begin 3, 4, 6, 7.); 01965 — unused; 0965 was Wigton (WN5) – numbers were transferred to 06973 (mixed): 01966 — unused; 0966 was Windermere (WM6) – numbers were transferred to 05394 (mixed) 0966 later used for Orange mobile; changed from 0966 to 07966 on 28 April 2001: 01967 — Strontian – – Was originally 0024 (OB4) until changed to 0967 in 1968; 01968 — Penicuik, West Linton (WL8); 01969 — Leyburn, Wensleydale (WN9); 01970 — Aberystwyth, Ystwyth (YS0); 01971 — Scourie, Wrath (WR1); 01972 — Glenborrodale (??); 01973 — unused; 0973 was Leeds, West Riding (WR3) – numbers were transferred to 0532 0973 later used for Orange mobile; changed from 0973 to 07973 on 28 April 2001: 01974 — Llanon, Ystwyth (YS4); 01975 — Alford (Aberdeen) and Strathdon, Water (WR5) (Note: (01975) ELNS area. Alford (Aberdeen) numbers begin 2, 4, 5, 9. Strathdon numbers begin 3, 6, 7, 8.); 01976 — unused; 0976 was Bradford, West Riding (WR6) – numbers were transferred to 0274 0976 later used for Orange mobile; changed from 0976 to 07976 on 28 April 2001: 01977 — Pontefract, West Riding (WR7); 01978 — Wrexham (WR8); 01979 — unused; original area allocation unknown 0979 7 later used for Jersey Telecom mobile; changed from 0979 7 to 07797 7 on 28 April 2001: 01980 — Amesbury, Wiltshire (WT0); 01981 — Wormbridge, Wye Valley (WV1); 01982 — Builth Wells, Wye Valley (WV2); 01983 — Isle of Wight (WT3); 01984 — Watchet (Williton) (WT4); 01985 — Warminster (WT5); 01986 — Bungay, Waveney (WV6); 01987 — Ebbsfleet; Brand new area code allocation post-BigNumber for a new town, chosen to be significantly different from the area codes of the adjacent areas of Gravesend and Dartford.: 01988 — Wigtown (WT8); 01989 — Ross-on-Wye, Wye Valley (WV9); 01990 — unused; 0990 was Wentworth (WW0) – numbers were transferred to 0344 0990 later used for BT NationalCall; changed from 0990 to 0870 5 on 28 April 2001: 01991 — unused; 0991 was Clynderwen, West Wales (WW1) – numbers were transferred to 0437 (ELNS) 0991 later used for Premium rate numbers; changed from 0991 to 09xx on 28 April 2001: 01992 — Lea Valley, Waltham X (WX2); 01993 — Witney (WY3); 01994 — St Clears, West Wales (WW4); 01995 — Garstang, Wyre (WY5); 01996 — unused; 0996 was Wilmslow (WW6) – numbers were transferred to 0625: 01997 — Strathpeffer, Wyvis (WY7); 01998 — unused; original area allocation unknown: 01999 — unused; The code 0999 was used for dialling by PO operators only to mobile relief exchanges in the Glasgow area in the 1970s. Likely reason for non-allocation of 01999 is similarity to the 999 emergency services access code.

01426, 01523 and other non-standard 01 prefixes were briefly used for pagers in the late 1990s and then moved to new 076 prefixes in the Big Number Change in 2000/2001.

In several area codes, a block of 1,000 numbers is set aside for use as fictional numbers for drama.

=== Code length ===
The length of the area code part and the local number part is found as follows:

Number format	NSN (Note: National Significant Number – the digit count after the 0 trunk code or 44 country code.)	Geographic area code
2+8 only	10	020, 023, 024, 028, 029
3+7 only	10	0113, 0114, 0115, 0116, 0117, 0118, 0121, 0131, 0141, 0151, 0161, 0191
4+6 only	10	All 01xxx area codes from 01200 to 01999 not otherwise mentioned.
4+6 areas where part of range is assigned as 5+5	10	01387, 01539
4+6 areas where part of range is assigned as mixed 5+5 and 5+4	10 or 9	01697
Mixed 4+6 and 4+5	10 or 9	01204, 01208, 01254, 01276, 01297, 01298, 01363, 01364, 01384, 01386, 01404, 01420, 01460, 01461, 01480, 01488, 01527, 01562, 01566, 01606, 01629, 01635, 01647, 01659, 01695, 01726, 01744, 01750, 01827, 01837, 01884, 01900, 01905, 01935, 01949, 01963, 01995
Mixed 4+6 and 4+5 areas where part of range is assigned as 5+5	10 or 9	01524, 01768, 01946
5+5 only	10	0138 73, 0152 42, 0153 94, 0153 95, 0153 96, 0169 73, 0169 74, 0176 83, 0176 84, 0176 87, 0194 67
Mixed 5+5 and 5+4	10 or 9	0169 77

The number format '2+8' refers to, e.g. London, numbers using the (020) xxxx xxxx format.

The number format '5+4' refers to, e.g. Brampton, numbers using the (0169 77) xxxx format.

=== Areas with mandatory area code dialling ===
In the following areas, the area code must be included when dialling local numbers. This enables local numbers to start with 0 or 1 and was introduced to increase the number of available telephone numbers within these areas.

Area code	Area code name	Date effective
01202	Bournemouth (BO2)	1 November 2012
01224	Aberdeen (AB4)	1 October 2014
01273	Brighton (BR3)	1 October 2014
01274	Bradford (BR4)	1 October 2014
01642	Middlesbrough (MI2)	1 October 2014
01908	Milton Keynes (WO8)	1 October 2014

== Overseas Territories ==
Unlike the Crown Dependencies of Jersey, Guernsey and the Isle of Man which use the UK area codes 01534, 01481 and 01624, respectively, telephone numbers in British Overseas Territories are not part of the UK telephone numbering plan. Some are members of the North American Numbering Plan (NANP). These calls are treated as international calls. Below are the access codes for the overseas territories:

=== North American Numbering Plan ===
Country code: 1

- Anguilla: area code 264
- Bermuda: area code 441
- British Virgin Islands: area code 284
- Cayman Islands: area code 345
- Montserrat: area code 664
- Turks and Caicos Islands: area code 649

=== Others ===
- British Antarctic Territory: +44 (shared with the UK)
- British Indian Ocean Territory: +246
- Falkland Islands and South Georgia and the South Sandwich Islands: +500
- Gibraltar: +350
- Saint Helena and Tristan da Cunha: +290

- The FCO also forwards some London landline numbers to offices in Tristan da Cunha

- Ascension Island: +247
- Akrotiri and Dhekelia: +357 (shared with Cyprus)
- Pitcairn Islands: +64 (shared with New Zealand)
