= Marston =

Marston may refer to:

== Places ==
=== United Kingdom ===
- Marston, Cheshire, a village and civil parish
- Marston, Herefordshire, a hamlet
- Marston, Lincolnshire, a village and civil parish
- Marston, Oxford, a village in Oxfordshire
- Marston, Church Eaton, a location in Staffordshire
- Marston, Milwich, a village and civil parish in Staffordshire
- Marston, North Warwickshire, a location in Lea Marston parish, Warwickshire
- Marston, Rugby, a location in Wolston parish, Warwickshire
- Marston, Wiltshire, a village and civil parish
- Marston Meysey or Marston Maisey, Wiltshire. a village and civil parish
- South Marston, Swindon, Wiltshire, a village and civil parish

=== United States ===
- Marston, Illinois, an unincorporated community
- Marston, Missouri, a city
- Marston, Maryland, an unincorporated community
- Marston, North Carolina, an unincorporated community
- Marston Lake, a reservoir in Denver, Colorado

=== Elsewhere ===
- Marston, Quebec, Canada, a township municipality
- Mount Marston, Victoria Land, Antarctica
- Marston Glacier, Victoria Land, Antarctica

== Other uses ==
- Marston (name), a list of people and fictional characters with the given name or surname
- Marston's (department store), former department store chain based in San Diego
- Marston's plc (before 2007: Wolverhampton & Dudley Breweries), British pub and hotel operator
- Marston Records, independent American record label, publisher of historical recordings
- Marston Road, east of Oxford, England

== See also ==
- Marstons Mills, Massachusetts, USA
- Marston Bigot, Somerset
- Marston Green, West Midlands
- Marston Magna, Somerset
- Marston Meysey, Wiltshire
- Marston Montgomery, Derbyshire
- Marston Moor, site of the Battle of Marston Moor, North Yorkshire
- Marston Moreteyne, Bedfordshire
- Marston on Dove, Derbyshire
- Marston St. Lawrence, Northamptonshire
- Marston Trussell, Northamptonshire
- Marston Vale, Bedfordshire
- Butlers Marston, Warwickshire
- Fleet Marston, Buckinghamshire
- Lea Marston, Warwickshire
- Long Marston, Hertfordshire
- Long Marston, North Yorkshire
- Long Marston, Warwickshire
- New Marston, Oxford
- North Marston, Buckinghamshire
- Potters Marston, Leicestershire
- Priors Marston, Warwickshire
- South Marston, Swindon, Wiltshire
- Marston mats, perforated steel sheets used during World War II for building airstrips
