= 01932 =

Dialing code in the United Kingdom

United Kingdom area code for Weybridge
- National calling: 01932
- International calling: +44 1932
- Conservation: No
- Active since: 16 April 1995
- Previous code: 0932
- Earlier code: 09322, 09323, 09326, 09327, 09328
- Number format: 01932 xxxxxx

Coverage
- Area served: Addlestone; Byfleet; Chertsey; Cobham; Longcross; New Haw; Ottershaw; Shepperton; Stoke d'Abernon; Sunbury-on-Thames; Upper Halliford; Walton-on-Thames; Weybridge; Wisley

01932 is the national dialling code for Weybridge in the United Kingdom. Before PhONEday, the area code was 0932. The phoneword mnemonic for 0932 corresponds with WE 2, where "WE" is taken from the letters W and E in Weybridge.

In common with all other British area codes, the initial '0' is a trunk prefix that is not required when dialling from abroad.

== Coverage ==
The dialling code contains seven telephone exchanges, which serve a mostly urban and suburban area in the north west of Surrey on the outskirts of Greater London, centred on the town of Weybridge.

Code	Exchange	Local Authority
LSBYF	Byfleet	Woking
LSCHER	Chertsey	Runnymede
LSCOB	Cobham	Elmbridge
LSOTT	Ottershaw	Runnymede
LSSUN	Sunbury-on-Thames	Spelthorne
LSWLTN	Walton-on-Thames	Elmbridge
LSWEY	Weybridge	Elmbridge

A telephone exchange previously existed in Longcross but its numbers were absorbed into the Chertsey exchange in the early 1970s.

Settlements served by the dialling code include: Addlestone, Byfleet, Chertsey, Cobham, Longcross, New Haw, Ottershaw, Shepperton, Stoke d'Abernon, Sunbury-on-Thames, Upper Halliford, Walton-on-Thames, Weybridge, Wisley.

== History ==
The Esher charge group contained two STD codes – 0932 with its Group switching centre (GSC) in Weybridge and 0372 with its GSC in Esher. Weybridge exchanges were not originally arranged in a linked numbering scheme, resulting in the necessity of local dialling codes to dial between exchanges. During the 1980s, the exchanges gradually became part of a linked numbering scheme with the STD code 0932 and the original 4 and 5 figure numbers became 6 figure.

Exchange name	Old numbering	New numbering
Weybridge	0932 40000 to 49999	0932 840000 to 849999
Weybridge	0932 50000 to 59999	0932 850000 to 859999
Walton-on-Thames	09322 20000 to 29999	0932 220000 to 229999
Walton-on-Thames	09322 40000 to 49999	0932 240000 to 249999
Byfleet	09323 40000 to 49999	0932 340000 to 349999
Byfleet	09323 50000 to 59999	0932 350000 to 359999
Cobham	09326 2000 to 7999	0932 62000 to 67999
Cobham	0932 60000 to 69999	0932 860000 to 869999
Sunbury-on-Thames	09327 60000 to 69999	0932 760000 to 769999
Sunbury-on-Thames	09327 80000 to 89999	0932 780000 to 789999
Chertsey	09328 60000 to 69999	0932 560000 to 569999
Ottershaw	093287 2000 to 3000	0932 872000 to 873000

Calls from the Esher charge group were charged at local rate to telephone exchanges in the following STD codes:

STD code	Location
01 / 071 / 081	London
0276	Camberley
0293	Crawley
0306	Dorking
0344	Bracknell
0372	Esher
0483	Guildford
0486	Guildford ring code (includes Woking)
0737	Redhill
0753	Slough
0784	Staines
0883	Oxsted
0895	Uxbridge
0932	Weybridge

Telephone exchanges in 0486 were gradually transferred into 0483, and added to the Guildford linked numbering scheme.

== Former local dialling codes ==
From London:

Exchange name	Dialling code 1965	Dialling code 1972	Dialling code 1982
Weybridge 5 fig.	WR	97	97
Walton-on-Thames 5 fig.	WT	98	98
Walton-on-Thames 6 fig.	N/A	N/A	0932
Byfleet 5 fig.	BY	91	91
Cobham 4 fig.	CM6	266	266
Sunbury-on-Thames 4 fig.	SM8	N/A	N/A
Sunbury-on-Thames 5 fig.	N/A	76	76
Sunbury-on-Thames 6 fig.	N/A	N/A	0932
Long Cross 3 fig.	LK85	0932 85	N/A
Chertsey 4 fig.	ML5	09328	09328
Ottershaw 3 fig.	LK87	N/A	N/A
Ottershaw 4 fig.	N/A	719	719

Local dialling codes for Weybridge exchanges were translated into routing digits by the directors in London telephone exchanges. The combined length of a local dialling code and number on the exchange was always 7 figures.

From Guildford:

Exchange name	Dialling code 1962	Dialling code 1963
Byfleet	953	953
Chertsey	84586	97386
Cobham	79	967
Longcross	N/A	97385
Ottershaw	N/A	97387
Sunbury-on-Thames	N/A	9737
Walton-on-Thames	841	965
Weybridge	845	973

Direct connections were provided between Guildford and Byfleet, Cobham, Walton-on-Thames, and Weybridge exchanges. Calls to other exchanges were routed via Weybridge. The unpublished dialling codes 9733, 9736, and 9732 would also have worked for Byfleet, Cobham, and Walton-on-Thames respectively in 1963 with the call routed via Weybridge.

From Slough:

Exchange name	Dialling code 1966
Byfleet	973
Chertsey	9786
Cobham	976
Longcross	9785
Ottershaw	9787
Sunbury-on-Thames	977
Walton-on-Thames	972
Weybridge	97

From Bagshot & Camberley:

Exchange name	Dialling code 1984
Byfleet	923
Chertsey	928
Cobham	92
Ottershaw	9287
Sunbury-on-Thames	927
Walton-on-Thames	92
Weybridge	92

Cobham and Walton-on-Thames had been incorporated into the Weybridge linked numbering scheme by 1984. Their previous dialling codes would have been 926 and 922 respectively.

From Walton-on-Thames:

Exchange name	Dialling code 1962
Cobham	50
Byfleet	51
Guildford	53
Chertsey	54
Woking	56
Sunbury-on-Thames	57
Staines	59
KINgston-upon-Thames	61
MOLesey	63
ELMbridge (Surbiton)	64
TEDdington Lock	65
EMBerbrook (Thames Ditton)	66
London director exchanges	7
Esher	8
Oxshott	8824
Epsom	8827
LOWer Hook (Chessington)	8828
Leatherhead	883
Bookham	88360
Ashstead	88366
Headley	88368
Dorking	894
Weybridge	9
ISLeworth	9822
Longcross	9825
HOUnslow	9827
Ottershaw	987
Slough	994

Walton-on-Thames was an interconnected telephone exchange with an arrangement of local dialling codes: 9 was the code for its parent Weybridge; 8 was the code for a direct connection to Esher; 5x were the codes for direct connections to other non-director exchanges; 6x were the codes for direct connections to nearby London director exchanges.

Calls to HOUnslow and ISLeworth London director exchanges were routed via Weybridge exchange. Calls to LOWer Hook exchange were routed via Esher exchange.

Other London director exchanges were reached by dialling 7 and the first three letters of the exchange name followed by the 4 figure number. E.g. for a call to WHItehall 1212, dial "7 WHI 1212".
