= 01527 =

Dialing code for Redditch in the United Kingdom

United Kingdom area code for Redditch
- National calling: 01527
- International calling: +44 1527
- Conservation: No
- Active since: 16 April 1995
- Previous code(s): 0527
- Earlier code(s): 0739
- Number format: 01527 xxxxxx, 01527 6xxxx

Coverage
- Area served: Astwood Bank; Bromsgrove; Catshill; Dodford; Hanbury; Lickey End; Redditch; Studley; Wychbold

01527 is the national dialling code for Redditch in the United Kingdom. Before PhONEday the area code was 0527. The mnemonic for 0527 corresponds with LA 7 where LA could have been taken from the letters L and A in Lapworth, a small village in Warwickshire close to Redditch but not served by the 0527 dialling code. The original dialling code for Redditch was 0739, with the mnemonic RE 9 where RE are taken from the letters R and E in Redditch.

In common with all other British area codes the initial '0' is a trunk prefix that is not required when dialling from abroad.

Redditch is one of a small number of dialling codes which still retains 5 figure telephone numbers. 01527 60000 to 69999 are located on Redditch (Old Town) telephone exchange. They are the successors to 07392 60000 to 69999, and prior to STD the original 4 figure numbers on the manual telephone exchange which served Redditch until the early 1960s.

== Coverage ==
The dialling code contains eight telephone exchanges which serve the towns of Redditch and Bromsgrove in Worcestershire, several villages in Worcestershire on the outskirts of these two towns, and the village of Studley in Warwickshire.

Code	Exchange	Local Authority
WMAST	Astwood Bank	Redditch
WMBPZ	Bromsgrove	Bromsgrove
WMHAN	Hanbury	Wychavon
WMHX	Headless Cross	Redditch
WMIPS	Ipsley	Redditch
WMRJ	Redditch (Old Town)	Redditch
WMSTD	Studley	Stratford-on-Avon
WMWYC	Wychbold	Wychavon

Settlements served by the dialling code include: Astwood Bank, Bromsgrove, Catshill, Dodford, Hanbury, Lickey End, Redditch, Studley, Wychbold

== History ==
Redditch was a dependent charge group of Birmingham during the period when its STD code was 0739 as it did not have its own Group switching centre (GSC). The routing digits for 0739 in distant STD exchanges were the same as those for Birmingham Newhall exchange followed by 194. Redditch telephone exchanges were not arranged in a linked numbering scheme, so 0739 was suffixed with a digit identifying the particular exchange.

Exchange name	Original STD code	New STD code
Redditch	07392	0527
Bromsgrove	07393	0527
Astwood Bank	07394	0527 89
Studley	07395	0527 85
Hanbury	07396	0527 84
Wychbold	07397	0527 86

The STD codes were changed some time in the early 1970s - possibly on the date that the Headless Cross GSC came into operation, replacing Birmingham Newhall. The new STD codes were unchanged in 1984.

Calls from the Redditch charge group were charged at local rate to telephone exchanges in the following STD codes:

STD code	Location
021	Birmingham
0299	Bewdley
0384	Dudley
0386	Evesham
0527	Redditch
0562	Kidderminster
0564	Knowle
0789	Stratford-on-Avon
0905	Worcester

== Former local dialling codes ==
From Birmingham:

Exchange name	Dialling code 1958	Dialling code 1965	Dialling code 1968	Dialling code 1987
Redditch 4 fig.	RE6	RE9	739	N/A
Redditch 5 fig.	N/A	RE	73	75
Redditch 6 fig.	N/A	N/A	N/A	7
Bromsgrove 4 fig.	BR3	BR3	273	N/A
Bromsgrove 5 fig.	N/A	N/A	26	26
Astwood Bank 3 fig.	Via operator	N/A	N/A	N/A
Astwood Bank 4 fig.	N/A	AS2	272	0527 89
Astwood Bank 6 fig.	N/A	N/A	N/A	0527
Hanbury 3 fig.	Via operator	0RE96	07396	0527 84
Studley 4 fig.	ST4	ST4	785	0527 85
Studley 6 fig.	N/A	N/A	N/A	0527
Wychbold 3 fig.	Via operator	0RE97	07397	0527 86
Wychbold 6 fig.	N/A	N/A	N/A	0527

Local dialling codes were not provided for telephone exchanges with 3 figure numbers. Calls to these exchanges were via the operator then later the full STD codes was used.

From Dudley:

Exchange name	Dialling code 1961	Dialling code 1985
Redditch	943	943
Bromsgrove 4/5 fig.	940	940
Bromsgrove 6 fig.	N/A	943
Astwood Bank	94388	94389
Hanbury	94384	94384
Studley 4 fig.	94389	94385
Studley 6 fig.	N/A	943
Wychbold	94386	94386

A direct link was provided between Dudley and Bromsgrove. Calls to other exchanges were routed via Redditch. The unpublished dialling code 94383 would also have worked for Bromsgrove in 1961 with the call routed via Redditch. 943 would also have worked for Bromsgrove 5 figure numbers in 1985 with the call routed via Redditch as the Bromsgrove exchange was now incorporated into the linked numbering scheme.

From Kidderminster:

Exchange name	Dialling code 1966	Dialling code 1967
Redditch	852	943
Bromsgrove	854	942
Astwood Bank	85288	94389
Hanbury	85284	94384
Studley	85280	94380
Wychbold	85286	94386

A direct link was provided between Kidderminster and Bromsgrove. Calls to other exchanges were routed via Redditch. The unpublished dialling codes 85283 and 94383 would also have worked for Bromsgrove in 1966 and 1967 respectively with the call routed via Redditch.

From Bewdley:

Exchange name	Dialling code 1967	Dialling code 1984
Redditch	9943	9943
Bromsgrove	9942	9942
Astwood Bank	994389	0527 89
Hanbury	994384	0527 84
Studley	994380	0527 85
Wychbold	994386	0527 86

Calls to Redditch exchanges were routed via Kidderminster. 9 was the local dialling code for Kidderminster from Bewdley. By 1984 the local dialling codes for satellite exchanges had been withdrawn from the code book and the full STD codes listed instead. The local dialling codes may still have worked. 994383 and 9943 would also have worked for Bromsgrove in 1967 and 1984 respectively with the call routed via Redditch.

From Evesham:

Exchange name	Dialling code 1963	Dialling code late 1960s
Redditch	96	96
Bromsgrove	9683	9683
Astwood Bank	9688	9689
Hanbury	9684	9684
Headless Cross	N/A	9687
Ipsley	N/A	9688
Studley	9689	9680
Wychbold	9686	9686

An undated dialling code card for Ashton-under-Hill from the late 1960s also includes local dialling codes for Headless Cross and Ipsley telephone exchanges.

From Pebworth:

Exchange name	Dialling code 1968
Redditch	99596
Bromsgrove	07393
Astwood Bank	07394
Hanbury	07396
Studley	07395
Wychbold	07397

Calls to Redditch were routed via Stratford-upon-Avon and Evesham. 9 was the local dialling code for Stratford-upon-Avon from Pebworth; 95 was the local dialling code for Evesham from Stratford-upon-Avon; and 96 was the local dialling code for Redditch from Evesham. The full STD codes are published for other exchanges but "chained" local dialling codes may have worked – such as 9959686 for Wychbold.
