= Martin Dales =

Hamlet in Lincolnshire, England

Coordinates: 53.140350°N 0.255614°W

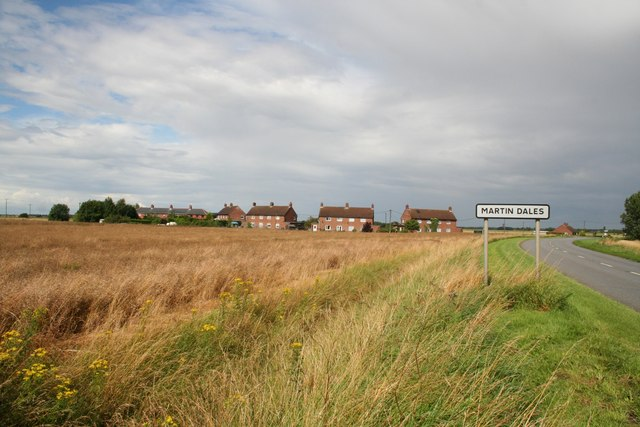
- Entering Martin Dales from Martin South Drove

- Location within Lincolnshire
- OS grid reference: TF164622
- Civil parish: Martin
- District: North Kesteven
- Shire county: Lincolnshire
- Region: East Midlands
- Country: England
- Sovereign state: United Kingdom
- Post town: Woodhall Spa
- Postcode district: LN10
- Dialling code: 01526
- Police: Lincolnshire
- Fire: Lincolnshire
- Ambulance: East Midlands
- UK Parliament: Sleaford and North Hykeham

Martin Dales is a hamlet in the civil parish of Martin and Martin Dales in North Kesteven, Lincolnshire, England. It is located to the east of Martin and west of Woodhall Spa.

== Description ==
The hamlet of Martin Dales stands in the parish of Martin and Martin Dales. There is no church, but there is a Grade II listed war memorial. There is also a public house.
