= Marston (name) =

Marston is a surname of English origin. Notable people with the name include:

== Surname ==
- Marston (surname)
- Marvin Marston, US Army officer, founder of the Alaska Territorial Guard, also called the Alaskan Scouts or Eskimo Scouts

== Given name ==
- Marston Bates (1906–1974), American zoologist
- Marston T. Bogert (1868–1954), American chemist
- Marston Clarke Buszard (1837–1921), English barrister and Member of Parliament
- Marston Conder (born 1955), New Zealand mathematician
- Marston Morse (1892–1977), American mathematician

== Fictional characters ==
- John Marston, protagonist of the video game Red Dead Redemption
- Paul Marston, a main character in The Long Goodbye by Raymond Chandler
- Elliott Marston, the antagonist in Quigley Down Under
- Snake Marston (comics), a Marvel Comics character
- Anthony Marston, a victim in Agatha Christie's And Then There Were None

== See also ==
- Marston (disambiguation)
