= Raughton Head =

Hamlet in Cumbria, England

Coordinates: 54.800°N 2.967°W

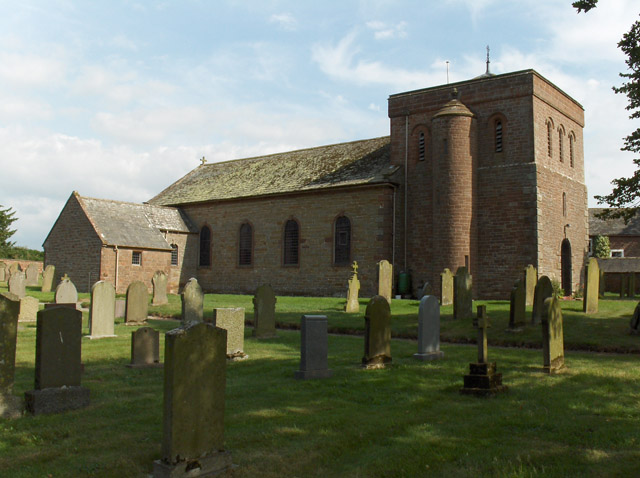
- All Saints Church, Raughton Head

- Location in the former City of Carlisle district, Cumbria Location within Cumbria
- OS grid reference: NY379454
- Civil parish: Dalston
- Unitary authority: Cumberland
- Ceremonial county: Cumbria
- Region: North West
- Country: England
- Sovereign state: United Kingdom
- Post town: CARLISLE
- Postcode district: CA5
- Dialling code: 016974
- Police: Cumbria
- Fire: Cumbria
- Ambulance: North West
- UK Parliament: Carlisle

Raughton Head is a hamlet in Cumbria, in the historic county of Cumberland, England, located 8 miles (13 km) south of Carlisle.

== Toponymy ==
The name Raughton Head is most likely derived from the Old English ragu–tūn, which means "Farmstead where moss or lichen grows", with the later addition of hēafod, meaning "hill". It has been recorded as Ragton (1182) and Raughtonheved (1367).

== History ==
Raughton Head was previously located within Castle Sowerby civil parish. The hamlet's previous church was dedicated to St. Jude. The church's building date is unknown, but it was rebuilt in 1678 by Edward Rainbowe and then again in 1760.

== Governance ==
Raughton Head is primarily governed by Dalston civil parish. It is then administered as part of the Cumberland unitary authority, and falls within the Carlisle constituency.

== Geography ==
Raughton Head is located between two rivers, the River Caldew and the River Roe.

== Places of worship ==
Raughton Head's only place of worship is All Saints Church, located within the Diocese of Carlisle. It was built in the 18th and 19th century, and is Grade II listed.

== Education ==
Raughton Head's only school is Raughton Head Church of England Primary School.
