= Maudlin, Cornwall =

Hamlet in Cornwall, England

Coordinates: 50°25′53″N 4°42′06″W

Maudlin
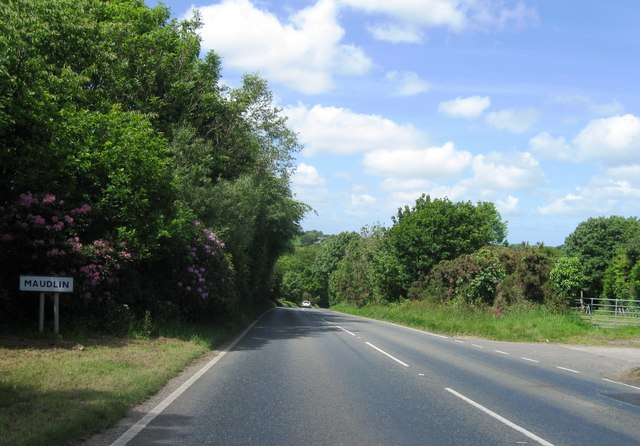

- Location within Cornwall
- Civil parish: Lostwithiel
- Unitary authority: Cornwall
- Ceremonial county: Cornwall
- Region: South West
- Country: England
- Sovereign state: United Kingdom
- Police: Devon and Cornwall
- Fire: Cornwall
- Ambulance: South Western

Maudlin is a hamlet in the civil parish of Lostwithiel, in Cornwall, England situated about 1 km south of Lanhydrock.
