= Marlow, Herefordshire =

Hamlet in Herefordshire, England

Coordinates: 52.383°N 2.885°W

Marlow
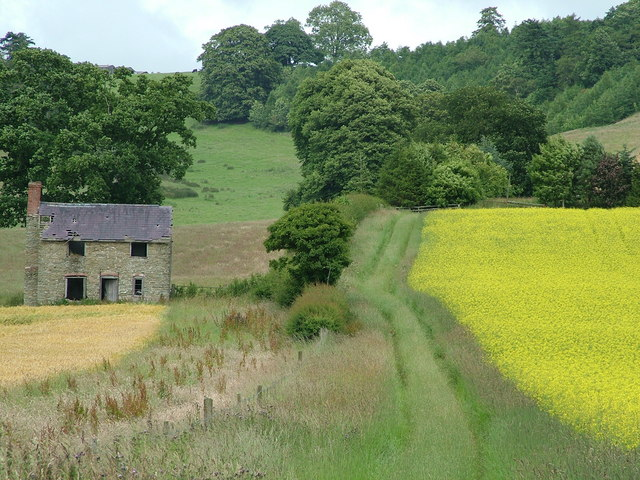
- Derelict cottage near Marlow

- Location within Herefordshire
- OS grid reference: SO399765
  - London: 159 miles (256 km)
- Civil parish: Leintwardine
- Unitary authority: Herefordshire
- Ceremonial county: Herefordshire
- Region: West Midlands
- Country: England
- Sovereign state: United Kingdom
- Post town: CRAVEN ARMS
- Postcode district: SY7 0
- Dialling code: 01547 540
- Police: West Mercia
- Fire: Hereford and Worcester
- Ambulance: West Midlands
- UK Parliament: North Herefordshire

Marlow is a hamlet in north Herefordshire, England.

It lies in the civil parish of Leintwardine, on the B4385 road 1.2 miles (1.9 km) north of that village. The River Clun flows to the west. Immediately to the north and west is the border with Shropshire. On the other side of the Clun (and in Shropshire) is the hamlet of Broadward. Between Marlow and Leintwardine is Stormer Hall. A Roman road runs just to the east of the hamlet; it is today a footpath only.

The placename derives from "place on the boundary hill".

There is a Royal Mail post box in the hamlet.
