= Marley, Dover =

Hamlet in Kent, England

Coordinates: 51.2333°N 1.3412°E

Marley
- Location within Kent
- OS grid reference: TR333535
- District: Dover
- Shire county: Kent
- Region: South East
- Country: England
- Sovereign state: United Kingdom
- Post town: Deal
- Postcode district: CT14
- Dialling code: 01304
- Police: Kent
- Fire: Kent
- Ambulance: South East Coast
- UK Parliament: Dover and Deal

Marley is a hamlet near the town of Deal in Kent, England. It is located about three miles (4.8 km) west of the town, on a minor road off the A258 road to Sandwich. The population of the hamlet is included in the civil parish of Northbourne.
