= Marazanvose =

Hamlet in Cornwall, England

Coordinates: 50°18′44″N 5°05′37″W

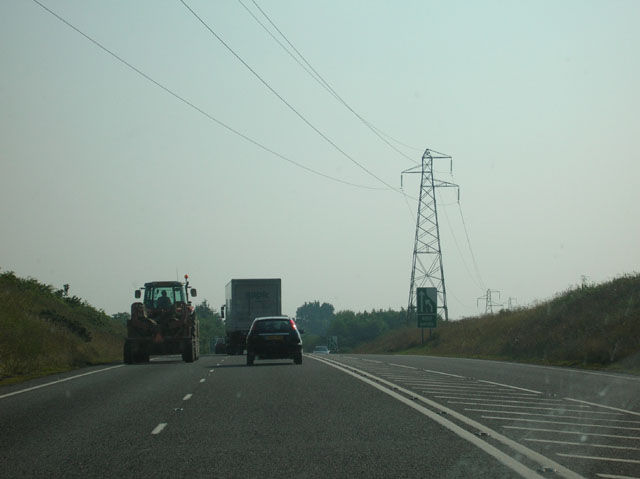
On the A30 near Marazanvose

Marazanvose is a hamlet southwest of Zelah in Cornwall, England. It is on the B3288 (previously on the A30 main road). In 2024, construction started of a green bridge, one of around 7 in the UK, as part of the Carland Cross to Chiverton Cross A30 improvement scheme.
