= Maryland, Monmouthshire =

Village in Monmouthshire, Wales

Maryland
- Village
- Location in Monmouthshire
- Coordinates: 51.7494°N 2.6989°W
- Country: Wales
- Principal area: Monmouthshire
- Lieutenancy: Gwent
- Time zone: UTC+0 (GMT)
  - Summer (DST): UTC+1 (BST)
- Postcode district: NP
- OS grid reference: SO530070

Maryland is a small village in Monmouthshire, Wales.

== Geography ==
Maryland is located six miles south east of Monmouth. It is situated in what is now termed the Wye Valley Forest Park, the upland area overlooking the Wye Valley AONB and part of the Trellech ridge, a rural, partly wooded area of Monmouthshire.

== History ==
A Methodist chapel was built at the village in 1860, but had been converted into other use by the 2000s.
