= Marshgate =

Hamlet in Cornwall, England

Coordinates: 50.697°N 4.620°W

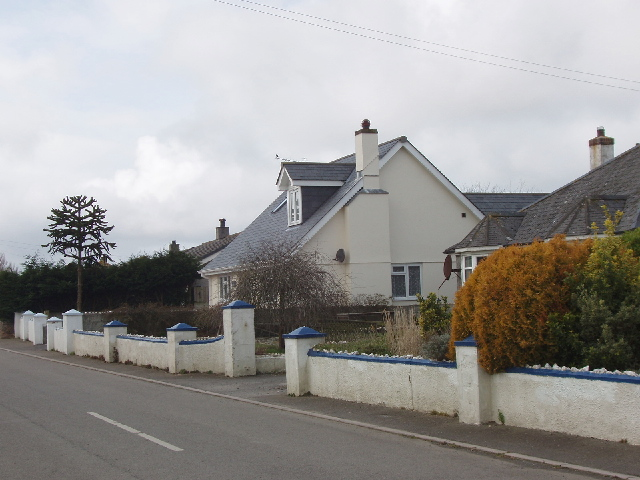
- Marshgate

- Location within Cornwall
- OS grid reference: SX151919
- Civil parish: Otterham
- Unitary authority: Cornwall
- Ceremonial county: Cornwall
- Region: South West
- Country: England
- Sovereign state: United Kingdom
- Post town: Camelford
- Postcode district: PL32 9

Marshgate is a hamlet partly in the parish of Otterham, Cornwall, England, UK. The population at the 2011 census was included in the civil parish of St Juliot. The village was at one time two settlements called Marshgate, and Trevenn – however the use of the latter name fell into disuse – seemingly in the 19th century.

Marshgate lies within the Cornwall Area of Outstanding Natural Beauty (AONB). It has a junior school and a post office & shop.

The village also boasts a large and very modern village hall, built with money from local fundraising and a lottery grant. There is also a small meeting room, separate from the main hall. The village hall has parking for about 25–30 cars and is used by numerous organisations from Marshgate, Tresparrett, Otterham and surrounding villages.

A nursery school called "Little Otters" adjoins the village hall and shares its car park.

For much of the 20th century Marshgate was dominated by its relationship with the busy A39 trunk road, The A39 runs alongside the northwest coast of Devon and Cornwall and the road went through the middle of Marshgate. Until 1977 when the M5 motorway was fully opened, the A39 road was the main route for holiday makers heading to Cornwall from Bristol, Wales and the midlands and in the summertime traffic levels were very high. The completion of the M5 to Exeter reduced the A39 traffic levels, but a lot still remained.

The A39 (and the original coast road of which it was an upgrade) made a dog leg around the Cockport area and ran through Marshgate and round to Tresparrett Posts. Cockport valley was historically very marshy in winter (a path down to that area from the village possibly gave Marshgate its name, although this is not possible to confirm). There was a smaller road, which went down through Cockport and required travellers to cross a ford at some times of the year. It was that smaller road which was considerably upgraded in the 1980s and thus became the current 3-lane section of the A39 route across that valley; the marshy area and the watercourse there now being crossed on a large embankment to obviate winter problems. The entrance to Canford Quarry is at the northeast end of the embankment.

The A39 upgrade meant that Marshgate was no longer inundated with traffic for much of the day and it became a more desirable place to live. This seems to have resulted in much infill building and the population of the village grew steadily as a result. Houses in the village were also extended or combined during this time. Today traffic through the village can still be a problem due to the narrowness of the road at two points, and there are no pavements. As at 2022, Marshgate and Tresparrett are participating in Cornwall's pilot scheme for limiting speeds to 20MPH in built up areas.

For reasons unknown part of the village lies in the parish of St Juliot, and part of it in Otterham Parish.
