= Mardu =

Coordinates: 52.451°N 3.081°W

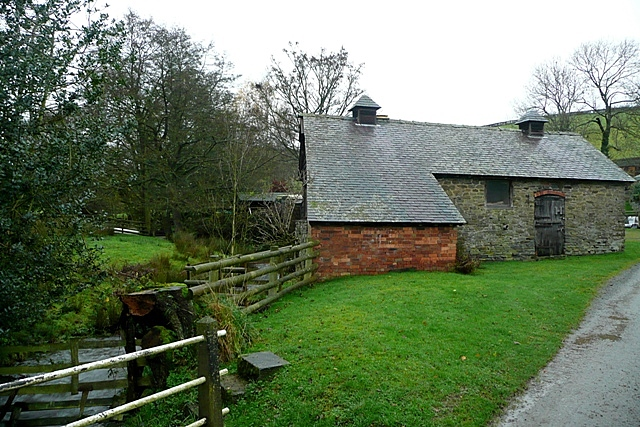
- Barn in Mardu

- Location within Shropshire
- OS grid reference: SO265842
- Civil parish: Newcastle on Clun
- Unitary authority: Shropshire
- Ceremonial county: Shropshire
- Region: West Midlands
- Country: England
- Sovereign state: United Kingdom
- Post town: CRAVEN ARMS
- Postcode district: SY7
- Dialling code: 01588
- Police: West Mercia
- Fire: Shropshire
- Ambulance: West Midlands
- UK Parliament: Ludlow

Mardu is a small village in Shropshire, England. It is located a mile northwest of the village of Whitcott Keysett.

The nearest town is Clun. The village lies at 246 metres (807 ft) above sea level.

Offa's Dyke Path runs through the village.
