= Group switching centre =

A group switching centre (GSC) was a United Kingdom telephone exchange used to provide local and trunk routing to local exchanges within its own and if required, adjacent group areas.

Group switching centres formed a component of the trunk mechanisation hierarchy that was commenced in 1939. The concept of group switching centres became important with the introduction of subscriber trunk dialling (STD) in 1958, initially from Bristol central telephone exchange. They were typically located towards the centre of their corresponding group area, usually in a large town or city, and serviced a group of local and dependent telephone exchanges within their home and adjacent group areas. The British network was separated into 639 pricing groups on January 1, 1958. These locations served as the foundation for calculating telephone call tariffs.

== History ==
Group switching centres were required because it was not cost-effective to have direct circuits between every exchange in the country. The GSC serving the calling party would act as a concentrator for trunk calls and an operator or, if an STD dialled routing was available, it would establish the call to the appropriate GSC serving the called party's exchange.

The area code (the STD code) for the called party would be translated by a register/translator into the routing code that set the route through the GSC's for the calling party to the called parties' exchange. a maximum of 6 routing digits was possible hence giving restrictions on the number of exchanges that could be directly dialled.

Different technologies were used for the unit, the Type 1 using cold cathode devices and the Type 4 magnetic drum, suitable for use in Director areas (these were initially London (1927), later Manchester (1930), Birmingham (1931), Glasgow (1937), Liverpool (1941) and Edinburgh. Types 2, 3 and 5 were electromechanical. Type 5 registers used PO type-4 uniselectors for storage, directly interfacing with sender/receivers that used SSMF2 multi-frequency signalling that was used on the Transit Network. Type 6 was an all-electronic unit (transistors and ferrite cores), Type 10 was an electromechanical incoming register using PO type-4 uniselectors, accepting signals from SSMF2 Sender/Receivers and pulsing-out the digits as LD (loop-dis). Types 12, 13 and 14 were electronic, using various technologies.

Until the Transit System was introduced in 1971, directly-dialled call routings could only involve one intermediate GSC due to transmission requirements, all other calls requiring an operator-assisted routing. GSC's were initially based on the Strowger step-by-step system as adopted by the Post Office for the telephone network. Subsequent developments permitted the use of crossbar switches designated as TXK1 which offered enhancements such as 2nd attempt routing; a facility not available on Strowger systems. Each of the 639 charging areas was associated or coterminous with one of 230 group switching centres which contained register-translators (also referred to as GRACE – Group Routing And Charging Equipment) required for local subscribers to originate self dialled trunk calls. During the introduction of international direct dialling (IDD), initially referred to as international subscriber dialling (ISD) within the UK, group switching centres were equipped with international call timers and international register-translators to route calls to the relevant international exchange for onward routing abroad.

Prior to the introduction of subscriber trunk dialling, most group switching centres housed operators in an auto manual centre (AMC) who were able to place any calls for subscribers in the local area that could not be directly dialled. Operators continued to be used after the introduction of subscriber trunk dialling, albeit on a reducing basis as direct-dialled routings became increasingly available until universal direct dialling between UK subscribers became available in 1979 via the trunk transit network.

== Functions ==
- Provide routing and charging control of inland subscriber dialled calls via register/translators.
- Provide routing and charging control of international subscriber dialled calls via international register/translators.
- Provide trunk routing based on trunk mechanisation and subsequently in conjunction with the Trunk Transit Network.
- Provide operator Services via the Auto Manual Centre (AMC).
- Provide inbound trunk routing to its own and, if required, adjacent charge groups.
- Provide an Emergency Manual Switching System (EMSS) for use during civil emergencies or nuclear war.
- Provide tandem routing of local and trunk calls as required.
- Provide local subscriber switching services.
