= Martin, North Kesteven =

Village in Lincolnshire, England

Coordinates: 53.127°N 0.328°W

Martin
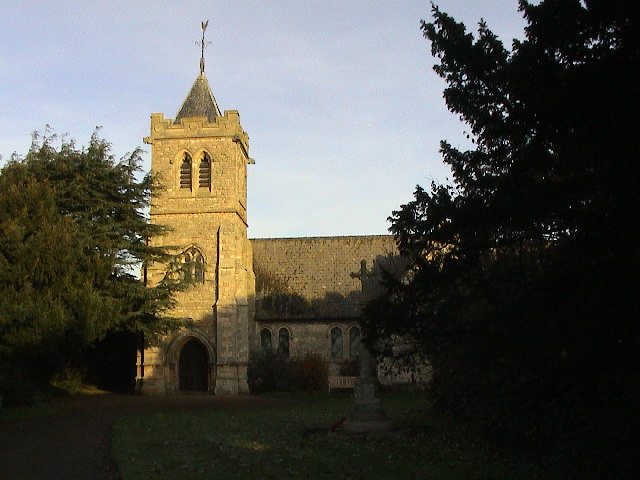
- Holy Trinity Church, Martin

- Location within Lincolnshire
- Population: 866 (2011)
- OS grid reference: TF120602
  - London: 110 mi (180 km) S
- District: North Kesteven
- Shire county: Lincolnshire
- Region: East Midlands
- Country: England
- Sovereign state: United Kingdom
- Post town: Lincoln
- Postcode district: LN4
- Dialling code: 01526
- Police: Lincolnshire
- Fire: Lincolnshire
- Ambulance: East Midlands
- UK Parliament: Sleaford and North Hykeham

Martin is a small village and civil parish in the North Kesteven district of Lincolnshire, England. The population at the 2011 census was 866. It lies approximately 5 miles (8 km) west of Woodhall Spa and 3 miles (5 km) east of Metheringham. The village of Timberland is to the south.

The village is on the western edge of the fen through which the River Witham runs. Martin Moor is a drained area to the east of the village, where there is a golf course.

Martin has a primary school and a church. The public house is the Royal Oak. The village shop also serves as the post office. A small reservoir lies 700 yards (640 m) north-east from the village.

== History ==
The name Martin is Old English mere+tun for "farmstead near a pool". In the 12th century, the village name is recorded as Martona. It is also often listed as Merton in older records, reflecting Old English origins of the name. The Fynes family, a cadet branch of the Earls of Lincoln, were seated at White Hall, or Martin Grange, until the 18th century.
