= Healthcare in the United Kingdom =

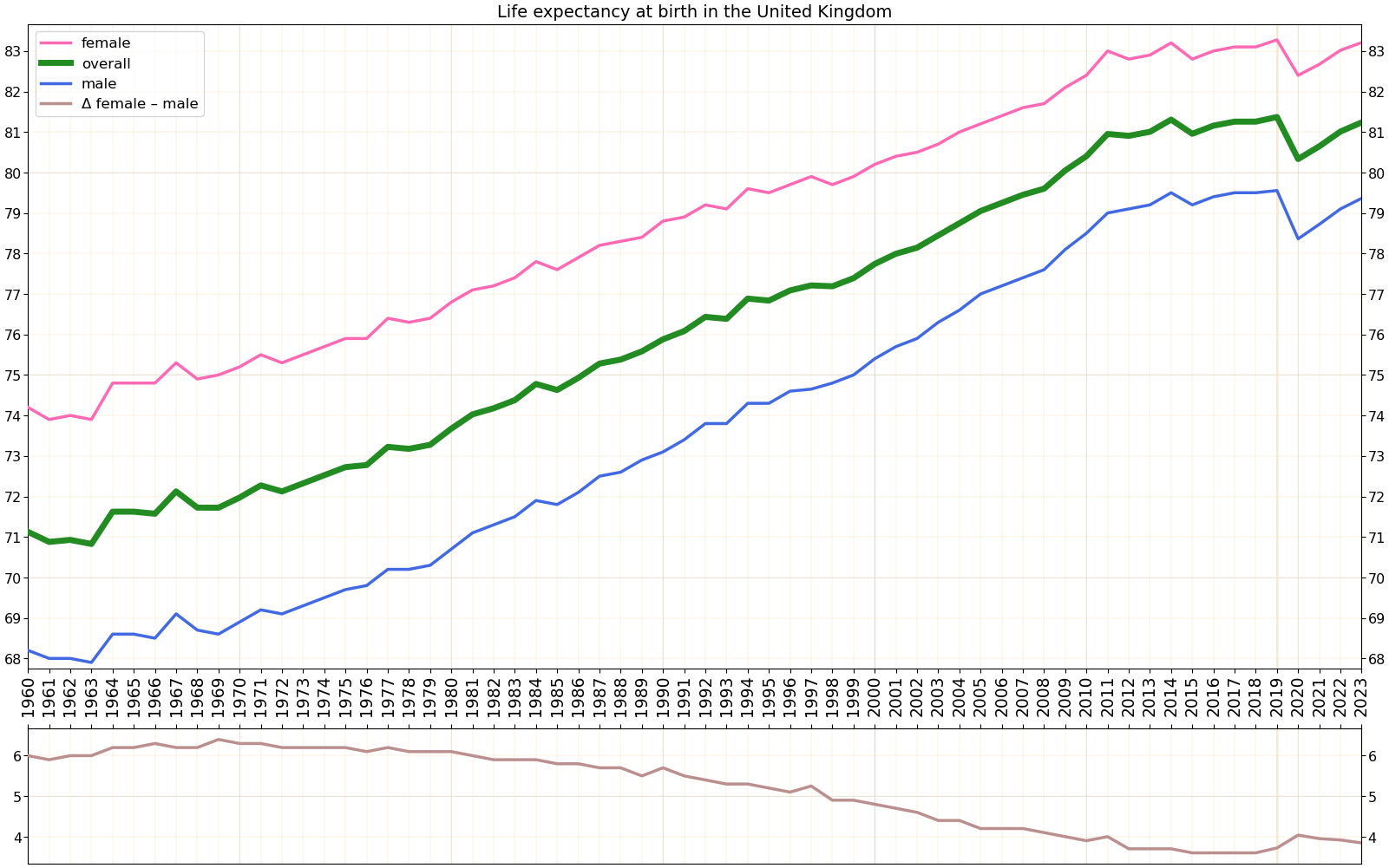
Life expectancy development in UK by gender

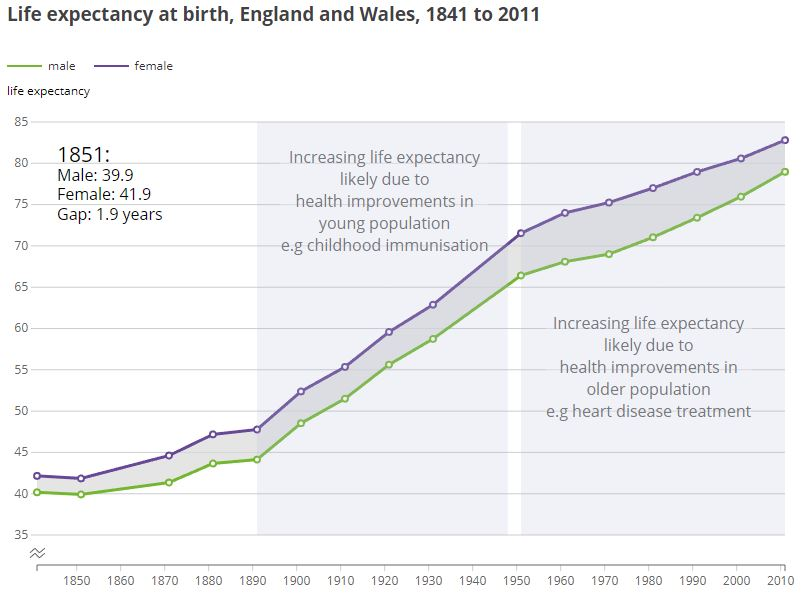
Comparison of life expectancy at birth in England and Wales

Healthcare in the United Kingdom is a devolved matter, with England, Northern Ireland, Scotland and Wales each having their own systems of publicly funded healthcare, funded by and accountable to separate governments and parliaments, together with smaller private sector and voluntary provision. As a result of each country having different policies and priorities, a variety of differences have developed between these systems since devolution.

- Healthcare in England
- Healthcare in Wales
- Healthcare in Scotland
- Healthcare in Northern Ireland

Despite there being separate health services for each country, the performance of the National Health Service (NHS) across the UK can be measured for the purpose of making international comparisons. In a 2017 report by the Commonwealth Fund ranking developed-country healthcare systems, the United Kingdom was ranked the best healthcare system in the world overall and was ranked the best in the following categories: Care Process (i.e. effective, safe, coordinated, patient-oriented) and Equity. The UK system was ranked the best in the world overall in the previous three reports by the Commonwealth Fund in 2007, 2010 and 2014.

The UK's palliative care has also been ranked as the best in the world by the Economist Intelligence Unit. On the other hand, in 2005–09 cancer survival rates lagged ten years behind the rest of Europe, although survival rates later increased. In 2015, the UK was 14th (out of 35) in the annual Euro health consumer index. The index has been criticised by academics, however.

The 2018 OECD data, which incorporates in health a chunk of what in the UK is classified as social care, has the UK spending £3,121 per head. Healthcare spending as a share of the gross domestic product (GDP) has increased since 1997, where it was 6.8 per cent. By 2019, healthcare expenditure in the UK amounted to 10.2 per cent of GDP. In 2017 the UK spent £2,989 per person on healthcare, around the median for members of the Organisation for Economic Co-operation and Development.

== Common features ==
Each NHS system uses General Practitioners (GPs) to provide primary healthcare and to make referrals to further services as necessary. Hospitals then provide more specialist services, including care for patients with psychiatric illnesses, as well as direct access to emergency departments. Community pharmacies are privately owned but have contracts with the relevant health service to supply prescription drugs.

The public healthcare system also provides free (at the point of service) ambulance services for emergencies, when patients need the specialist transport only available from ambulance crews or when patients are not fit to travel home by public transport. These services are generally supplemented when necessary by the voluntary ambulance services (British Red Cross, St Andrews Ambulance Association and St John Ambulance). In addition, patient transport services by air are provided by the Scottish Ambulance Service in Scotland and elsewhere by county or regional air ambulance trusts (sometimes operated jointly with local police helicopter services) throughout England and Wales.

In specific emergencies, emergency air transport is also provided by naval, military and air force aircraft of whatever type might be appropriate or available on each occasion, and dentists can only charge NHS patients at the set rates for each country. Patients opting to be treated privately do not receive any NHS funding for the treatment. About half of the income of dentists in England comes from work sub-contracted from the NHS, however not all dentists choose to do NHS work.

When purchasing drugs, the NHS has significant market power that, based on its own assessment of the fair value of the drugs, influences the global price, typically keeping prices lower. Several other countries either copy the UK's model or directly rely on Britain's assessments for their own decisions on state-financed drug reimbursements.

=== Private medicine ===
Patients can choose to go private, meaning they can choose to pay for private hospital medicine, either out of pocket or through private insurance plans. Individual private healthcare and health insurance remains a niche, unregulated market in the UK. Most regions do not have sufficiently developed private healthcare infrastructure to provide full patient care. The full range of private medical services is available only in limited locations. Even when services exist for those who can pay or are insured, the cover of private medical insurance in the UK is often limited to planned procedures. As a result, many insured patients will still go to an NHS General Practitioner, obtain NHS prescriptions, and use an NHS emergency department. On the other hand, many private healthcare providers, especially in England, will contract with NHS facilities in their locale to provide treatment for patients, particularly in mental health and planned surgery, and conversely, some private treatments are offered for NHS patients.

Primary care, paid for by the NHS, is almost entirely provided by private contractors – general practitioners, community pharmacists, dentists and opticians – who may provide commercial services in addition to NHS services.

Healthwatch England found in 2026 that use of private healthcare had increased because of long waiting lists for NHS treatment. 16% of people they surveyed had used the private sector in 2025, up from 9% in 2023.

== Healthcare in England ==
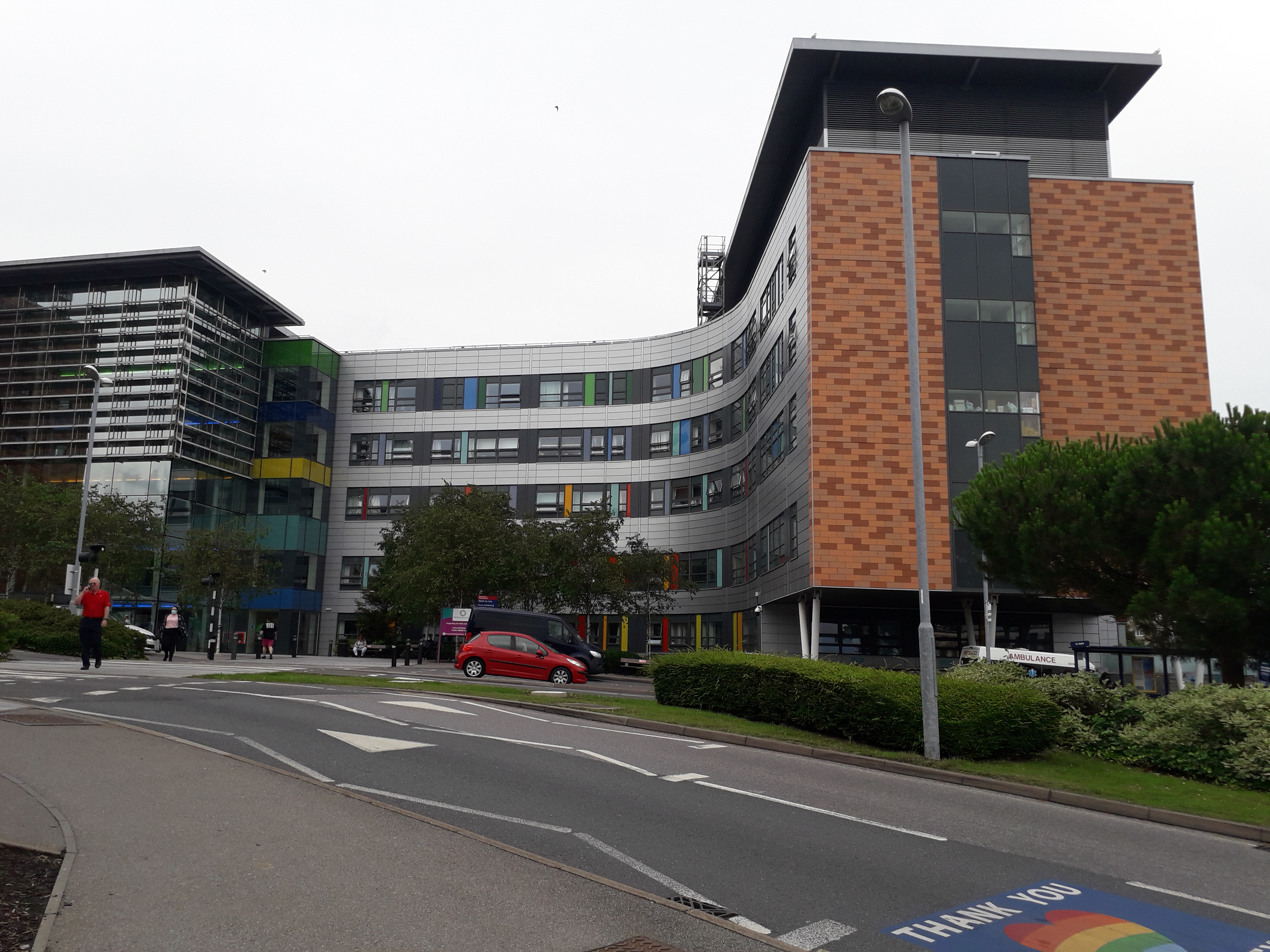
The Queen Alexandra Hospital is one of the NHS hospitals serving the city of Portsmouth and the surrounding area. The hospital's affiliated universities are the University of Portsmouth and the University of Southampton School of Medicine.

Most healthcare in England is provided by the NHS England, England's publicly funded healthcare system, which accounts for most of the Department of Health and Social Care's budget (£122.5 billion in 2017–18).

== Healthcare in Northern Ireland ==
The biggest part of healthcare in Northern Ireland is provided by Health and Social Care in Northern Ireland. Though this organization does not use the term 'National Health Service', it is still sometimes referred to as the 'NHS'.

== Healthcare in Scotland ==
The majority of healthcare in Scotland is provided by NHS Scotland; Scotland's current national system of publicly funded healthcare was created in 1948 at the same time as those in Northern Ireland and in England and Wales, incorporating and expanding upon services already provided by local and national authorities as well as private and charitable institutions. It remains a separate body from the other public health systems in the United Kingdom, although this is often not realised by patients when "cross-border" or emergency care is involved due to the level of co-operation and co-ordination; occasionally becoming apparent in cases where patients are repatriated by the Scottish Ambulance Service to a hospital in their country of residence once essential treatment has been given but they are not yet fit to travel by non-ambulance transport.

Public health matters are handled by Public Health Scotland which is sponsored by the Scottish Government and local authorities (through COSLA).

== Healthcare in Wales ==
The majority of healthcare in Wales is provided by NHS Wales. This body was originally formed as part of the same NHS structure for England and Wales created by the National Health Service Act 1946 but powers over the NHS in Wales came under the Secretary of State for Wales in 1969 and, in turn, responsibility for NHS Wales was passed to the Welsh Government under devolution in 1999. Public health matters are handled by Public Health Wales.

== Comparisons between the healthcare systems in the United Kingdom ==
=== Differences ===
==== Telephone advisory services ====
Each NHS system has developed ways of offering access to non-emergency medical advice. People in England and Scotland can access these services by dialling the free-to-call 111 number. Scotland's service is run by NHS24. The telephone number for NHS Direct Wales/Galw Iechyd Cymru was 0845 4647, but the 111 service was rolled out across all areas in 2022.

==== Best practice and cost effectiveness ====
In England and Wales, the National Institute for Health and Clinical Excellence (NICE) sets guidelines for medical practitioners as to how various conditions should be treated and whether or not a particular treatment should be funded. These guidelines are established by panels of medical experts who specialise in the area being reviewed.

In Scotland, the Scottish Medicines Consortium advises NHS Boards there about all newly licensed medicines and formulations of existing medicines as well as the use of antimicrobiotics but does not assess vaccines, branded generics, non-prescription-only medicines (POMs), blood products and substitutes or diagnostic drugs. Some new drugs are available for prescription more quickly than in the rest of the United Kingdom. At times this has led to complaints.

==== Cost control ====
The National Audit Office reports annually on the summarised consolidated accounts of the NHS, and Audit Scotland performs the same function for NHS Scotland.

Since January 2007, the NHS have been able to claim back the cost of treatment, and for ambulance services, for those who have been paid personal injury compensation.

==== Parking charges ====
Parking charges at hospitals have been abolished in Scotland, and have also been abolished in Wales. From April 2020, those with greatest need—disabled people, frequent outpatient attenders, parents of sick children staying overnight and staff working night shifts—have had access to free parking in England. Parking charges at hospitals in Northern Ireland were abolished in 2024, when an Act passed by the Northern Ireland Assembly in 2022 prohibiting them had taken effect.

==== Prescribed drugs ====
In a sample of 13 developed countries, the UK was 9th in its population-weighted usage of medication in 14 classes in both 2009 and 2013. The drugs studied were selected on the basis that the conditions treated had high incidence, prevalence and/or mortality, caused significant long-term morbidity and incurred high levels of expenditure and significant developments in prevention or treatment had been made in the last 10 years. The study noted considerable difficulties in cross border comparison of medication use.

The right to NHS prescriptions is based on residence, not nationality. Northern Ireland, Scotland and Wales no longer charge for prescriptions. In England, a fixed prescription charge is payable for up to a three-month supply of each item (£9.35 as of April 2022), regardless of actual cost. There are many exemptions from the charge, including patients under 16 years old (18 if still in full-time education), over 60, with certain medical conditions, on low incomes or in receipt of certain benefits.

Permanent residents in England who are liable to pay prescription charges can purchase a Prescription Prepayment Certificate (PPC) covering all prescriptions in a specified period; a three-month PPC costs about three times the price of a single prescription, and a 12-month PPC a little less than twelve times the individual price. No charges are made anywhere in the UK for prescriptions administered at a hospital, by a doctor or at an NHS walk-in centre.

==== Role of private sector in public healthcare ====
From the birth of the NHS in 1948, private medicine has continued to exist, paid for partly by private insurance. Provision of private healthcare acquired by means of private health insurance, funded as part of an employer funded healthcare scheme or paid directly by the customer, though provision can be restricted for those with conditions such as AIDS/HIV. In recent years, despite some evidence that a large proportion of the public oppose such involvement, the private sector has been used to increase NHS capacity. In addition, there is some relatively minor sector crossover between public and private provision with it possible for some NHS patients to be treated in private healthcare facilities and some NHS facilities let out to the private sector for privately funded treatments or for pre- and post-operative care. However, since private hospitals tend to manage only routine operations and lack a level 3 critical care unit (or intensive therapy unit), unexpected emergencies may lead to the patient being transferred to an NHS hospital.

When the Blair government expanded the role of the private sector slightly within the NHS in England, the Scottish government reduced the role of the private sector within public healthcare in Scotland and planned legislation to prevent the possibility of private companies running GP practices in future. Later, however in an attempt to comply with the Scottish Treatment Time Guarantee, a 12-week target for inpatient or day-case patients waiting for treatment, NHS Lothian spent £11.3 million on private hospital treatment for NHS patients in 2013–14.

==== Funding and performance of healthcare since devolution ====
In January 2010 the Nuffield Trust published a comparative study of NHS performance in England and the devolved administrations since devolution, concluding that while Scotland, Wales and Northern Ireland have had higher levels of funding per capita than England, with the latter having fewer doctors, nurses and managers per head of population, the English NHS is making better use of the resources by delivering relatively higher levels of activity, crude productivity of its staff, and lower waiting times. However, the Nuffield Trust quickly issued a clarifying statement in which they admitted that the figures they used to make comparisons between Scotland and the rest of the United Kingdom were inaccurate due to the figure for medical staff in Scotland being overestimated by 27 per cent.

Using revised figures for medical staffing, Scotland's ranking relative to the other devolved nations on crude productivity for medical staff changes, but there is no change relative to England. The Nuffield Trust study was comprehensively criticised by the BMA which concluded "whilst the paper raises issues which are genuinely worth debating in the context of devolution, these issues do not tell the full story, nor are they unambiguously to the disadvantage of the devolved countries. The emphasis on policies which have been prioritised in England such as maximum waiting times will tend to reflect badly on countries which have prioritised spending increases in other areas including non-health ones."

In April 2014 the Nuffield Trust produced a further comparative report "The four health systems of the UK: How do they compare?" which concluded that despite the widely publicised policy differences there was little sign that any one country was moving ahead of the others consistently across the available indicators of performance. It also complained that there was an increasingly limited set of comparable data on the four health systems of the UK which made comparison difficult.

In February 2016 the Organisation for Economic Co-operation and Development published a review which concluded that performance of the NHS in Wales was little different from that in the rest of the UK. They described performance across the UK as "fairly mediocre" saying that great policies were not being translated into great practices. They suggested that GPs should be more involved in health boards and that resources should be shifted out of hospitals.

== See also ==
- National Health Service
- Emergency medical services in the United Kingdom
- Private healthcare in the United Kingdom
- Healthcare UK
- Health in the United Kingdom
