= NHS 24 =

Scottish healthcare advice service

- Type: Telehealth / Telehomecare
- Established: May 2002; 24 years ago
- Region served: Scotland
- Website: www.nhsinform.scot

NHS 24 is Scotland's national telehealth and telecare organisation. This special health board runs a telephone advice and triage service that can be accessed by calling 111. The service allows people who feel unwell or those caring for them to obtain health advice and information if it is not convenient or possible to wait until they can visit their general practitioner when the practice is next open. The advice line is not intended as a substitute for obtaining an emergency ambulance service via 999. The telehealth services provided by NHS Scotland fulfil similar functions to NHS 111 Wales and the NHS 111 scheme in England.

== History ==
Following the establishment of NHS Direct in England, Susan Deacon Minister for Health and Community Care announced in December 2000 that a 24-hour helpline service would be set up for Scotland. NHS 24 was established as a Special Health Board on 6 April 2001 under the NHS 24 (Scotland) Order 2001, although the overall aims for Health Boards are defined by the NHS (Scotland) Act 1978 and subsequent legislation. Management consultancy work that took place over an eight week period drew some comment.

The telephone helpline service launched in May 2002, with the first contact centre in Aberdeen providing advice to callers from the Grampian area using around 85 nurses and 40 other staff. The service was then rolled out to other areas in the North of Scotland. By August 2002 there were three contact centres operational- in Aberdeen, Clydebank and South Queensferry. By February 2004, the service had more than 800 staff, providing a service for people in the Ayrshire and Arran, Fife, Grampian, Greater Glasgow and Highland boards- effectively coverage of half the population of Scotland. Within two years of being set up it had taken one million calls.

At peak times, calls may be answered in any one of these centres. NHS 24 also acts as the first point of contact for primary care advice in the out-of-hours period.

The 2004 Scottish GP contract contained a right for GPs to opt-out of out-of-hours working. By 2006, 80% of Scottish GP practices had exercised this right.

From autumn 2004, patients calling NHS 24 began to experience delays. The algorithms used by the NHS 24 call handlers in 2004 were purchased under licence from an American company but these weren't divulged to other clinicians working in the health service due to clauses in the commercial agreement. Having endured some chronic staffing problems, the service was having difficulty coping with demand by July 2005. By January 2009, sickness absence had reduced and there was a low waiting time for call pick-ups except for during spikes of demand, however the organisation had now appointed its fourth chief executive in just five years.

In August 2010, a health information website NHS Inform was launched, bringing together national and local health information. The first phase was officially opened by Nicola Sturgeon, Cabinet Secretary for Health and Wellbeing. The website later made use of a BrowseAloud feature - allowing users to listen to information where they preferred or need this. There were almost 1.5 million calls a year being received by 2012/2013.

In September 2011, Capgemini were announced as the preferred bidder for a customer relations management system, replacing the previous supplier Clinical Solutions. A contract was signed in April 2012, and the new call handing and IT computer system, called the Future Programme was expected in 2013, but experienced significant delays. With a cost of £117 million, the new system crashed on 28 October 2015 shortly after it was launched. It was shut down on 13 November to allow the problems to be resolved, but by the following year it was thought that the new system might not be relaunched until 2017.

In January 2013, plans were announces to make the service free to use, and accessible via a three digit number, instead of the eleven digit number. In May 2014, the 111 number went live in Scotland.

== Services ==
The service can be used in more than one way:

=== Self-help guide (Internet) ===
This enables advice to be obtained without a consultation by answering a series of questions after accessing the main NHS 24 website and selecting the "NHS Self-help guide" option. Users will be given one of three final recommendations:

- Self-care, if it is safe to manage the problem at home
- Call NHS 24, if it is necessary to speak to a member of NHS 24 staff for further advice
- Dial 999, if the problem requires the use of an ambulance service

Since 2005, the NHS 24 online service has included access to information from a "NHS Health Encyclopaedia", giving information on illnesses, conditions, tests and treatment and to pharmacy opening times throughout Scotland. Some information that is made available via this internet service is used under licence from the UK Department of Health. All health information is from governed sources. To reflect the healthcare needs of the Scottish population NHS 24 work with individuals, groups and organisations from different areas of health and social care policy and practice in Scotland.

=== Telephone ===
The normal telephone number, 111, is for most callers who are able to use a telephone without difficulty. This number is free to call from mobile phones as well as landlines, and was adopted across Scotland in April 2014 to replace the old number, 08454 24 24 24, which has been phased out. A translation service is provided for a number of languages for which leaflets are issued which instruct callers to tell the NHS 24 staff "I am [nationality described in English], I do not speak English.". There is also a Textphone number.

Trained call handlers triage patients according to outcomes to a set of questions. If the service is busy, lower-priority calls will be placed in a clinical queue which is monitored. Depending on the triage outcome, callers will be called back within one, two or four hours. Callers are always told to call back if their condition worsens. During particularly busy times, callers are always told in a recorded message how long they will expect to wait before their call is answered.

At the end of the consultation, NHS 24 will contact the Scottish Ambulance Service if an emergency response is necessary.

Instructions for use of the service by people who do not speak English are available.

== Organisation ==
A management board has responsibility for the running of the organisation.
