= Patients' Rights Directive 2011 =

Directive 2011/24/EU
- European Union directive
- Title: Patients’ Rights Directive
- Made by: European Parliament and Council

The Patients’ Rights Directive 2011 (2011/24/EU) is a Directive in EU law that codifies rights to receive health care across member state borders. It enables member states to require prior authority to manage outflow of patients, and permission can be refused on safety grounds.

== Contents ==
Article 4 states that with the "principles of universality, access to good quality care, equity and solidarity, cross-border healthcare shall be provided" according to member state laws, and EU safety legislation. Article 5 requires certain cross border health care to be reimbursed. Article 7 sets out the restrictions and requirements for reimbursing health care costs.

== Case law ==
Before the Directive, under what is now TFEU article 56, in R (Watts) v Bedford Primary Care Trust a patient from Britain travelled to France for a hip replacement to avoid long waiting lists and applied for reimbursement, claiming that otherwise her freedom to receive services was infringed. The Court of Justice held that proportionate restrictions could be legitimate.

== Public Health and Member States' Responsibilities ==
The Patients' Rights Directive 2011 recognizes that while cross-border healthcare is permitted within the EU, member states are responsible for ensuring the provision of safe and high-quality healthcare to their citizens. The Directive ensures that patients can seek treatment abroad when necessary and that they are reimbursed for healthcare costs under specific conditions. Member states may limit reimbursement if there are concerns about the quality or safety of the care provided. This framework ensures compliance with EU health standards while respecting each member state’s autonomy in managing its healthcare system.

== See also ==
- EU law
- UK enterprise law
