= 111 (New Zealand telephone number) =

New Zealand emergency telephone number

In New Zealand, 111 (usually pronounced one-one-one) is the emergency telephone number. It was first implemented in Masterton and Carterton on 29 September 1958, and was progressively rolled out nationwide with the last exchanges converting in 1988. In 2019, the New Zealand police introduced a new number, the 105 non-emergency police telephone number, to take non-urgent police calls away from the "111" service.

== History ==
=== Introduction ===
Before the introduction of 111, access to emergency services was complicated. For the quarter of New Zealand's then 414,000 telephone subscribers still on manual telephone exchange, one would simply pick up the telephone and ask the answering operator for the police, ambulance, or fire service by name. However, the problem on manual exchanges was that calls were answered first-come-first-served, which meant on busy exchanges, emergency calls could be delayed. For automatic exchanges, one would need to know the local police, ambulance or fire service's telephone number, or look it up in the telephone directory, or dial the toll operator and ask them to place the call. The problem was that the numbers were different for each exchange, and again, there was no way to tell emergency calls apart from regular calls. Auckland, for example, had 40 telephone exchanges, and the telephone directory had 500 pages to search through to find the right number, although the separate emergency numbers for fire, police and ambulance in the main service area (e.g. Auckland, but not for not minor exchanges) were listed in bold on the first page.

Following the 1947 Ballantynes fire in Christchurch, fire officer Arthur Varley was recruited from the UK to bring about a reform of the fire service. Familiar with Britain's 999 system, he campaigned for the setting up of a universal emergency telephone number across the country. In mid-1957, a committee was set up to institute a common emergency number across New Zealand, consisting of the Post and Telegraph Department, the Police, the Health Department, and the Fire Service. In early 1958, the Postmaster General approved the provision of the service using the number 111.

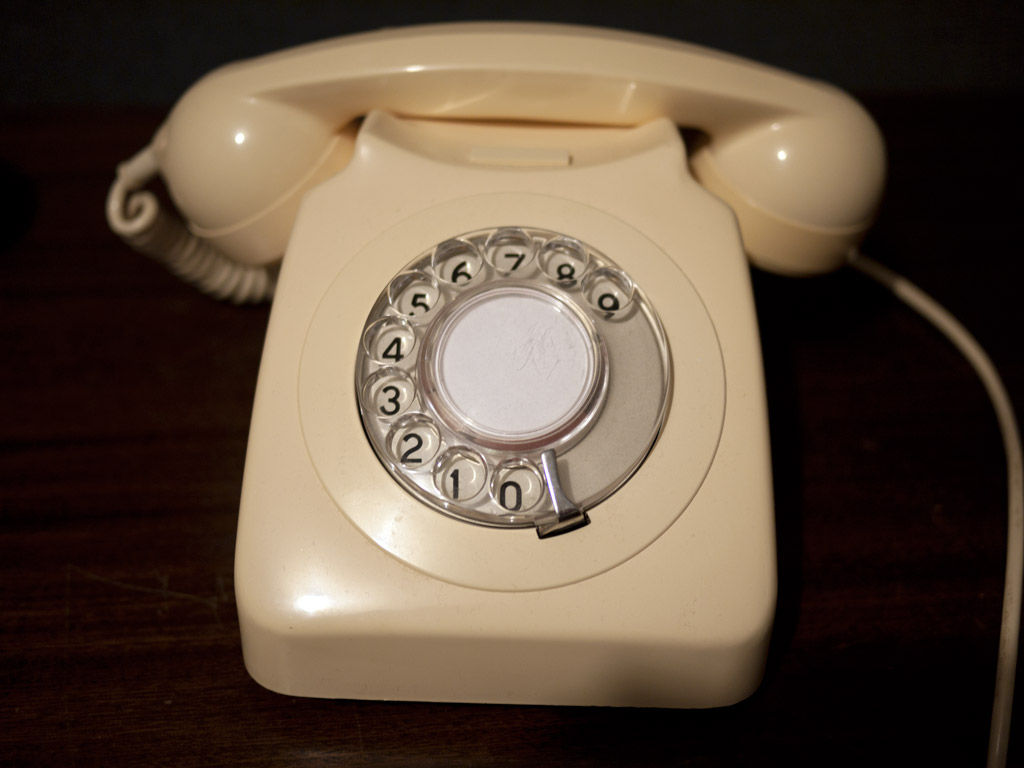
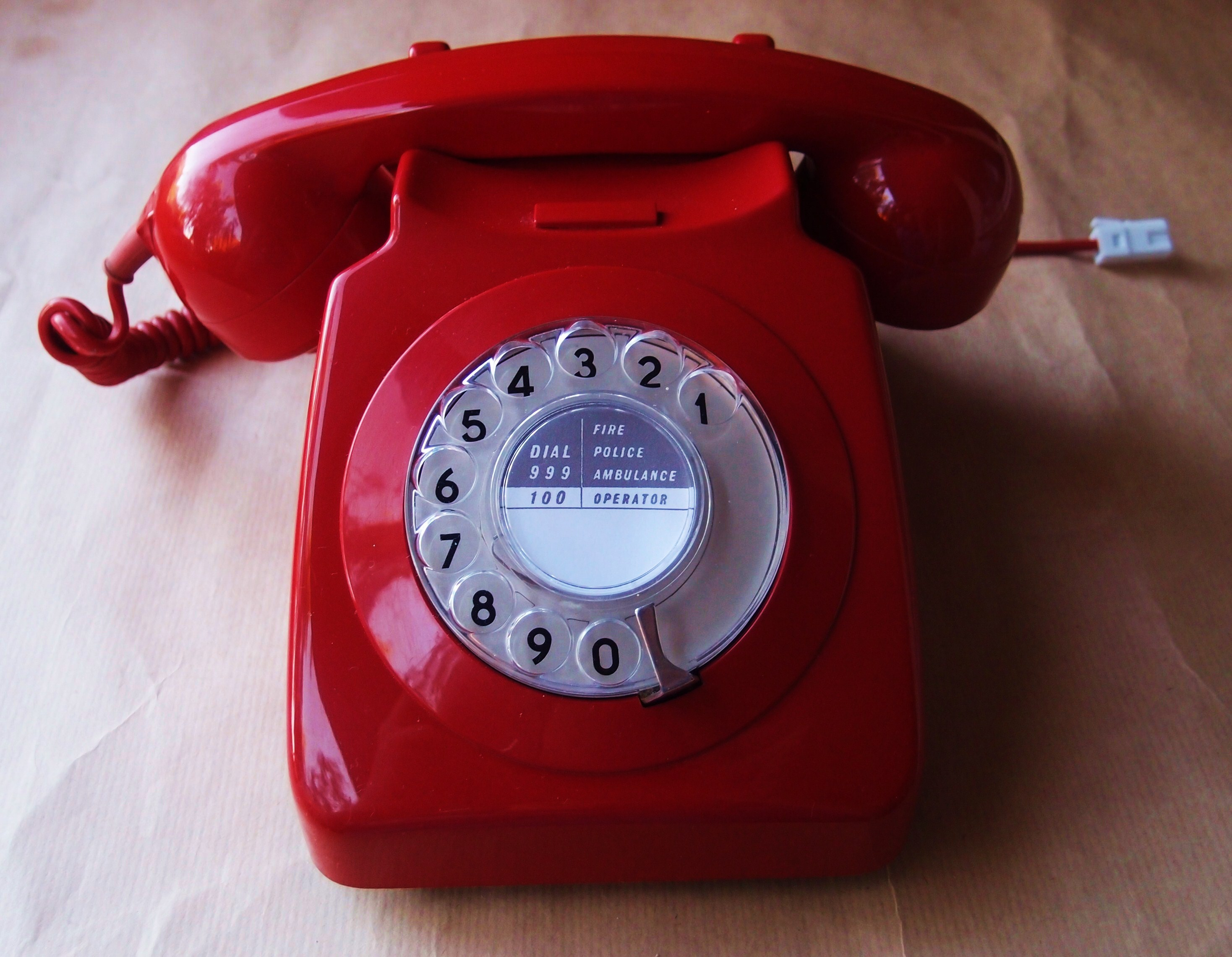
A New Zealand rotary dial telephone (top) and a British rotary dial telephone (bottom). Note the 1 on the New Zealand phone is in the same position as the 9 on the British phone.

111 was specifically chosen to be similar to Britain's 999 service. With pulse dialling, New Zealand telephones pulse in reverse to the UK – dialling 0 sent ten pulses, 1 sent nine, 2 sent eight, 3 sent seven, etc. in New Zealand, while in the UK, dialling 1 sent one pulse, 2 sent two, etc. In the early years of 111, exchanges primarily used British-built step-by-step equipment, except for this unusual orientation. Therefore, dialling 111 on a New Zealand telephone sent three sets of nine pulses to the exchange, exactly the same as the UK's 999. Number "9" in New Zealand (or "1" in Britain) was not used for the first digit of telephone numbers because of the likelihood of accidental false calls from open-wire lines tapping together, etc.

The telephone exchange in Masterton was replaced in 1956, and was the first exchange to have the technology installed for the 111 service. Hence, Masterton and nearby Carterton were the first towns in the country to get the new service.

The 111 service began on 29 September 1958 in the two towns. When a subscriber dialled 111 at either exchange, the call was routed by the automatic exchange onto one of three dedicated lines to the toll switchboard at the Masterton exchange (although the exchange connected calls automatically, long-distance (toll) calls still had to be connected manually through an operator). A red light glowed on the switchboard panel, and another red light would glow on top of the switchboard. Two hooters also sounded, one in the exchange and the other in the building passage. The first operator to plug into the line took the call, and a supervisor would plug into the line to help if the situation became difficult.

Dedicated lines connected the toll switchboard to the Masterton police station, fire brigade, and the hospital, where they were connected to a special red telephone. The line connected to the fire station, when it rang, also sounded the station alarm bells. A similar arrangement was employed at the police station, while at the hospital the call went to the local switchboard where it was identified by a red light and a distinctive bell.

Among the first 111 calls was a call for an ambulance after an accident at a sawmill, and call to the fire service after a rubbish tip fire in Carterton. The first hoax call also occurred on the first day – a caller dialled 111 to ask for the address of a Carterton hotel.

=== Expansion ===
After the introduction of 111 in Masterton and Carterton, the service soon expanded to most major towns and cities.

The service was introduced in Wellington in April 1961, where the multi-exchange area included some pre-war Rotary exchanges.

Christchurch introduced 111 from 11 pm on 28 August 1964. The introduction coincided with cutting in new exchanges at Linwood and Hillmorton and the introduction of six-figure telephone numbers for most suburban exchanges.

By the 1970s, every automatic exchange in New Zealand had 111 service.

The dates of installation in major towns and cities were:

Place	Date	Note
Ashburton	November 1962	
Auckland	27 September 1968	
Christchurch	28 August 1964	
Dunedin	1966	
Gisborne	20 April 1959	
Hamilton	1960	
Invercargill	by October 1960	
Masterton	29 September 1958	
Napier-Hastings	November 1960	
Nelson	1960	
New Plymouth	1961	
Palmerston North	1961	
Rangiora	8 September 1967	coincided with the transition to an automatic exchange
Timaru	25 September 1959	coincided with the transition to an automatic exchange
Wanganui	by October 1960	
Wellington	23 April 1961	
Westport	October 1962	
Whangarei	24 August 1962	

=== Controversy ===
In New Zealand in 2004, the police answering of emergency telephone service came under sustained scrutiny for systemic problems. A case that caused particular concern was the disappearance of Iraena Asher, who vanished in October 2004 after she rang the police in distress and was instead sent a taxi that went to the wrong address. On 11 May 2005 a severely critical independent report into the Police Communications Centres was released. It expressed ongoing concerns for public safety, and identified inadequate management, poor leadership, inadequate training, understaffing, underutilised technology and a lack of customer focus as being underlying risks for systemic failures. The report made over 60 recommendations for improvement, including recommending a 15 to 20 year strategy to move away from using 111 as an emergency telephone number because of problems with misdialling due to the repeated digits. Despite ambiguous reporting, these issues were never with the 111 service itself, and did not impact fire or ambulance services. The problems were restricted solely to the Police Communications Centres.

In February 2024, documents from the New Zealand Police showed that the 111 service was outdated and was causing deaths and injuries. For example, a woman was stabbed to death by her partner after she was overheard calling 111, it is believed, if she was able to use another method to contact 111 such as texting, there is a possibility she would not have been detected. Furthermore, a man drowned at a beach with only ambulance staff being alerted despite both police and surf and rescue being on the beach at the time, neither emergency service was made aware of the event due to the outdated system and therefore neither responded. The emergency system failed 59 times in the year 2021-2022 with a police spokesperson saying, “The public may not receive timely help when they need it, and frontline responders could find themselves attending dangerous incidents without pertinent situational information and without adequate support.” Both Police and Fire and Emergency have released reports stating that there was an "urgent" and "pressing" need to replace the system. The New Zealand Government denied to spend NZ$60 million to replace the aging system.

In September 2022 a boat capsized after colliding with a whale off the coast of Goose Bay killing 5 of the 11 occupants. A 111 call was made from the hull of the vessel, however according to an inquiry by the Transport Accident Investigation Commission (TIAC) the 111 system caused "unnecessary delays" and risks. It took 68 seconds to progress from the first calltaker whose only job is to direct calls to the correct emergency service to the second calltaker, the target is 10 seconds. The inquiry stated, "the design of the two-stage system created unnecessary delay and increased the risk of a call being dropped before the caller had explained their emergency. For the public it is not always clear who the most appropriate emergency service is, and often multiple agencies are required to attend. This confusion could result in callers selecting the wrong emergency service, delaying the response." Another focus was on the communication and resource deployment (CARD) a vital component of the 111 system which police attempted to use to provide Hato Hone St John with the location of the capsizing, failed as the coordinates are at sea. According to the inquiry, police entered the nearest land-based address. This raised issues when the Coastguard contacted police to request the coordinates, police had to change the location in the system and as a result the Coastguard was given coordinates in the general Goose Bay area, not the original location. TIAC went on to say that the communication and resources deployment system of emergency services are not integrated and causes delays to the flow of information in multi-agency operations.

== Contacting 111 ==
Mobile networks will treat a 111 call as the highest priority, disconnecting another call if necessary to allow it to go through. If the mobile network someone’s phone is connected to has limited or no coverage where they are calling from, an attempt will automatically be made to access another mobile network to ensure the call is connected. All 111 calls are free of charge under every circumstance unless it is a non-genuine call made from a landline.

Upon dialling 111, the caller will first hear a recorded message: "You have dialed 111 emergency; your call is being connected." This message was added in 2008 to allow people who have accidentally dialled 111 to hang up straight away. The Spark 111 emergency operator will then answer: "This is the 111 operator, do you need the fire, the ambulance, or the police?". The operator will then connect the caller to the required service: "I'm connecting you to the [service] now, please stay on the line with me." The Spark 111 emergency operator will remain connected with the caller until the specific service's communications centre has answered, and two way communication has been confirmed.

Emergency calls for some other services also use 111, but are still connected to one of the three services. For example, search and rescue or civil defence emergencies are connected to the New Zealand Police. Gas leaks and hazardous substance emergencies are connected to Fire and Emergency New Zealand.

In the interest of international compatibility, calls to foreign emergency numbers 911 and 112 are automatically diverted to 111, while dialling other international emergency numbers reaches a recorded message guiding the caller to call 111. On average, 48% of calls to 111 are non-genuine, despite this police say they do not want to discourage people from call 111 if they are in genuine need of emergency services. Over time, several measures have been introduced to attempt to reduce the number of non-genuine calls, such as the recorded message played to callers as soon as they dial 111 and charging for non-genuine calls made from landlines.

In May 2017, New Zealand introduced the Emergency Caller Location Information (ECLI) Service for providing the location of 111 mobile callers. ECLI has two sources of location:

1. Advanced Mobile Location (both Google's Android Emergency Location Service, and since March 2018 Apple's AML for iOS); and
2. Network based location to provide a mobile callers probable location using statistical analysis to derive the callers probable location based on the cell tower connecting the emergency call (this is not triangulation as triangulation requires multiple cell towers which is not the norm for rural areas) with an accuracy of 1+ kilometer;

Depending on a number of environmental conditions the location provided can be as precise as 4 meters using the GNSS capabilities of a smartphone. All location data is only to be held for 60 minutes and is then deleted to comply with the regulated conditions of use of ECLI as set by the NZ Privacy Commissioner.

== 111 contact code ==
The 111 Contact Code is a code made to make sure that people are able to call 111 with a landline during a power cut. It was written by the Commerce Commission, was finalised in November 2020, and came into effect in February 2021. The contact code was required to be created by 1 January 2022 under the Telecommunications (New Regulatory Framework) Amendment Act. It was created due to a shift towards fibre and wireless communications which require power sources. The code requires that telecommunications service providers tell their customers at least once a year that they can not call 111 during a power cut. If customers are not able to call emergency services during a power cut, for example if they can not use a mobile phone, then the service provider must provide a device that allows customers to call for at least eight hours during a power outage.

In April 2024 the Commerce Commission brought One NZ to the High Court for allegedly breaching the code.

== Other New Zealand emergency and related numbers ==
Other than 111, the following national emergency and related numbers are used for different services:-

- 105: police single non-emergency number; introduced in 2019 for non-emergency calls to the police.
- *555: traffic incidents (dialable from mobile phones only)
- 0508-82-88-65: non-emergency Suicide Crisis Helpline (111 is used for immediate danger)
- 0800-16-16-10: deaf emergency fax (connects to police)
- 0800-16-16-16: deaf emergency textphone/TTY (connects to police)
- 0800-76-47-66: poisons and hazardous chemicals emergency
- 0800-61-11-16: non-emergency medical advice ("Healthline", run by Health New Zealand – Te Whatu Ora)
- 0800-808-400: railway emergencies (KiwiRail Network)
- 0800-50-11-22: Military Police (NZDF Military Police)

Other emergency numbers vary from area to area, or from service provider to service provider. These numbers can be found under the "Emergency Information" section on pages 2 and 3 of the local White Pages telephone directory.

== International usage of 111 ==
- In South Korea, 111 is a special telephone number for accessing National Intelligence Service to report crimes that threaten national security.
- In England, Wales and Scotland, 111 is a non-emergency medical helpline provided by the National Health Service.
- In Vietnam, 111 is a child protection hotline.

== See also ==
- 105 (telephone number), the non-emergency telephone number
- Emergency telephone
- In Case of Emergency (ICE) entry in mobile phone
