= R (Ann Marie Rogers) v Swindon Primary Care Trust =

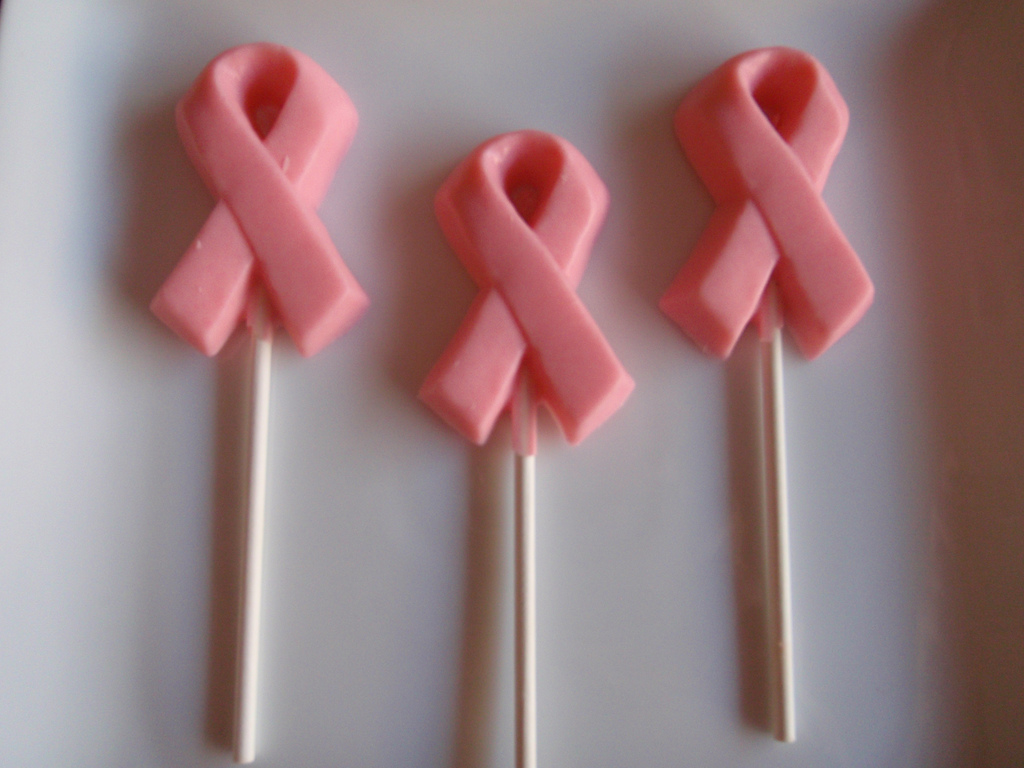
- Court: Court of Appeal (England and Wales)
- Citation: [2006] EWCA Civ 392

Keywords
- Health

R (Ann Marie Rogers) v Swindon Primary Care Trust [2006] EWCA Civ 392 is a UK enterprise law case, concerning health care in the UK.

== Facts ==
Ms Rogers claimed that she should be treated with Herceptin for her breast cancer, although it was not yet licensed by the National Institute for Health and Care Excellence. Dr Cole, her consultant, was turned down by Swindon Primary Care Trust for the treatment. She could only afford two doses herself. The PCT would only fund if her case was ‘exceptional’ but after a review it decided her case was not, because all women with stage 1 breast cancer were in the same position as Ms Rogers. She brought judicial review, arguing the PCT had acted irrationally.

Bean J dismissed Ms Rogers' appeal for judicial review.

== Judgment ==
The Court of Appeal held the 'exceptionality' review had been meaningless, and the decision was irrational.

Sir Anthony Clarke MR said the following:

If that policy had involved a balance of financial considerations against a general policy not to fund off-licence drugs not approved by NICE and the healthcare needs of the particular patient in an exceptional case, we do not think that such a policy would have been irrational ...

[...]

Where the clinical needs are equal, and resources are not an issue, discrimination between patients in the same eligible group cannot be justified on the basis of personal characteristics not based on healthcare.

== See also ==
- United Kingdom enterprise law
