= Harmonised service of social value =

Type of freephone service in the European Union

Decision 2007/116/EC
- European Union decision
- Text with EEA relevance
- Title: Commission Decision of 15 February 2007 on reserving the national numbering range beginning with 116 for harmonised numbers for harmonised services of social value
- Made by: European Commission

History
- Date made: 30 December 2006
- Entry into force: 15 February 2007
- Implementation date: 31 August 2007

A harmonised service of social value is a type of freephone service available in the European Union and in some non-EU countries (including the countries in the European Economic Area and United Kingdom), which answers a specific social need, in particular which contributes to the well-being or safety of citizens, or particular groups of citizens, or helps citizens in difficulty. The phone numbers and the corresponding service descriptions are managed by the European Commission and harmonised across all EU and EEA member states. Harmonised services of social value use the prefix 116, which is then followed by three digits indicating the type of service.

After the commission has assigned a number, it is then up to the telephone regulator in each country to allocate the number to a telephone service provider and providing organisation of their choice. The first telephone numbers to be allocated are 116 000 (missing children helplines), 116 111 (child help lines) and 116 123 (emotional support helplines).

== Assignments ==
As of August 2026, the following numbers have been assigned by the European Commission:

Number	Name	Description
116 000	Hotline for missing children	The service (a) takes calls reporting missing children and passes them on to the police; (b) offers guidance to and supports the persons responsible for the missing child; (c) supports the investigation.
116 006	Helpline for victims of crime	The service enables victims of crime to get emotional support in such circumstances, to be informed about their rights and about ways to claim their rights and to be referred to the relevant organisations. In particular, it provides information about (a) local police and criminal justice proceedings; (b) possibilities of compensation and insurance matters. It also provides support in finding other sources of help relevant to the victims of crime.
116 016	Helpline number for victims of violence against women	Women who are victims of violence are able to call the same number across the European Union to access advice and support.
116 111	Child helplines	The service helps children in need of care and protection and links them to services and resources; it provides children with an opportunity to express their concerns, talk about issues directly affecting them and contact someone in an emergency situation.
116 117	Non-emergency medical on-call service	The service directs callers to the medical assistance appropriate to their needs, which are urgent but non-life-threatening, especially, but not exclusively, outside normal office hours, over the weekend and on public holidays. It connects the caller to a skilled and supported call-handler or connects the caller directly to a qualified medical practitioner or clinician.
116 123	Emotional support helplines	The service enables the caller to benefit from a genuine human relationship based on non-judgmental listening. It offers emotional support to callers suffering from loneliness, in a state of psychological crisis, or contemplating suicide.

The number 116 112 will not be used in order to avoid confusion with the single European emergency number 112. In addition, the number 116 116 is in use in Germany as an anti-fraud hotline.

A reservation by the commission obligates member states to make the numbers available for registration by interested parties. However, the listing of a specific number and the associated harmonised service of social value does not carry an obligation for member states to ensure that the service in question is provided within their territory.

== National implementations ==
Each service is now available in at least part of the EU, plus EEA and the UK. The 116 117 medical assistance line is the least-widely implemented so far, having only been activated in Austria, Germany, most Italian regions, and former EU-member Great Britain. By contrast, the 116 000 missing children line is active in 27 countries and the 116 111 child helpline is available in 22 countries.

Country	116 000	116 006	116 016	116 111	116 117	116 123
Austria	Rat auf Draht	Weisser Ring		Unassigned	Notruf Niederösterreich GmbH	Unassigned
Denmark	Børns Vilkår	Offerrådgivningen i Danmark		Børns Vilkår	Unassigned	Unassigned
Finland	Emergency Response Centre Agency (Finland)	Rikosuhripäivystys (provided by MIELI Mental Health Finland)		Mannerheim League for Child Welfare	Päivystysapu 116117 (DigiFinland Oy)	Unassigned
France	Centre Français de Protection de l'Enfance	France Victimes		Unassigned	Unassigned	Unassigned
Germany	Initiative Vermisste Kinder	Weisser Ring		Nummer Gegen Kummer	Die Kassenärztliche Bundesvereinigung	TelefonSeelsorge
Ireland	ISPCC	Crime Victims Helpline		Childline (ISPCC)	Unassigned	Samaritans
Italy	Linea gratuita per ogni bambino scomparso (provided by Telefono Azzurro)	800 919108 (Rete Dafne)	1522 – Numero Anti Violenza e Stalking	1 96 96 (provided by Telefono Azzurro)	Continuità Assistenziale (in six Italian regions)	02 2327 2327 (Telefono Amico Italia)
Poland	Fundacja Itaka	Unassigned		Fundacja Dzieci Niczyje	Unassigned	Instytut Psychologii Zdrowia
Spain	Fundación ANAR	Fundación ANAR		Unassigned	Unassigned	Unassigned
Norway	Unassigned	Krisesentersekretariatet		Alarmtelefonen for barn og unge	Legevakt	Mental Helse
United Kingdom	Missing People	Unassigned		Childline	NHS 111 (Great Britain only) Unassigned (NI)	Samaritans

== Similar services in other countries ==
Similar phone number services exist in other countries to serve specific community needs.

=== Australia ===
==== Police Assistance Line – 131 444 ====
In Australia the phone number 131 444 is the Police Assistance line and can be used for non-emergency contact with Police to report a crime, or to make enquiries. Each State or Territory police force administers the Police Assistance line, with routing of a call taking place based on where the call connects if called on a mobile phone. Issues can arise at border towns, or particularly around the Australian Capital Territory (ACT) as it is located entirely within New South Wales (NSW), calls made on a mobile phone may be connected in NSW or vice-versa.

131 444 is called "Policelink" in Queensland.

==== Crime Stoppers – 1800 333 000 ====
In Australia Crime Stoppers is a not for profit run charity organisation that works closely with local police, and allows people to report crime, provide information about unsolved crimes or report suspicious activity anonymously. Reports can be made online, or via the phone number.

==== Emergency Alert Australia – +61 444 444 444 ====
Emergency Alert Australia is a system that can send text messages or voice recordings to mobile phones and landlines in a specific geographic area to warn the public in that area of an emergency situation, such as bushfires, floods, etc. The messages come from the phone number 0444 444 444 (or +61 444 444 444). The system is also used in NSW for people to look out for high risk missing persons, such as the elderly, or those with mental health problems. The phone number cannot receive calls or text messages.

=== New Zealand ===
==== Police non-emergency - 105 ====
The New Zealand Police operates 105 for non-emergency calls where an immediate response is not required or when the event has already taken place and nobody is in any danger, such as a stolen car, property damage, to add additional information to an existing police report or to contact the local police station. Police launched the number on 10 May 2019 and is available for free 24/7 by phone, or online via the 105 website. The number was created to give the New Zealand public another way to contact police to ease pressure on the 111 emergency telephone number.

==== Police road incident - *555 ====
The New Zealand Police operates *555 for reporting road incidents or an unsafe driver such as crashes without injuries, minor obstruction to roadways or unsafe, but non life-threatening driving. When you call the police communicator will ask you where you are, how long ago the incident happened, the vehicle licence plate and what is happening now. The information will be passed along to frontline police, but will often only result in a warning letter. Police still urge drivers to call 111 for more serious instances such as a serious motor vehicle crash or any instances where life is at risk.

==== Crime Stoppers - 0800 555 111 ====
In New Zealand Crime Stoppers (Māori: Aukati Takahi Ture) is a not-for-profit run charity organisation that anonymously passes along reports to police, and allows people to report crime, provide information about unsolved crimes or report suspicious activity. The public can make reports by phone, or online via the Crime Stoppers website.

==== Healthline - 0800 611 116 ====
Healthline is a free over-the-phone health service that operates 24/7. Funded by Health New Zealand | Te Whatu Ora the line is used for non-emergency health advice from nurses and paramedics. Healthline is not to be confused with the 111 emergency telephone number which handles emergency medical events.
