= Childline =

British youth phone counselling service

ChildLine
- Founded: 1986
- Founder: Dame Esther Rantzen
- Location: London
- Region served: United Kingdom
- Product: Telephone helpline, online 1-2-1 counsellor chat, email a counsellor through Childline
- Website: childline.org.uk

Childline is a British counselling service for children and young people under 19 in the United Kingdom provided by The National Society for the Prevention of Cruelty to Children. They deal with any issues which cause distress or concern; some of the most common issues include child abuse, bullying, mental illness, parental separation and/or divorce, teenage pregnancy, substance misuse, neglect, and psychological abuse.

== Confidentiality ==
Childline Counsellors will not record calls but write down case notes of calls and sometimes counselling supervisors may also listen in to calls to make sure that they can help the best they can. If there is an immediate serious concern for someone's welfare or they are worried a child's life is in danger, notes may be passed on to relevant bodies, including the Police and the NHS. Callers are not required to provide their name; they can give as little or as much personal information as they wish.

== History ==
ChildLine logo used from 2007 to 2018

In 1986 Esther Rantzen, presenter of consumer television show That's Life!, suggested to the BBC that they create "Childwatch", a programme about child abuse that was screened on 30 October 1986 on BBC1, the aim being to try to detect children at risk before their lives were in danger. Viewers were asked if they would take part in the survey in an edition of That's Life!. A helpline was opened after the programme so that any child currently suffering abuse could call for help. Rantzen, together with her BBC producers Sarah Caplin and Ritchie Cogan, therefore suggested they should create a helpline specifically for children in danger or distress, to be open throughout the year, 24/7, and launch it on the programme. The project was made possible by a benefactor Ian Skipper who underwrote the charity for the first three years. In 1988, the charity appointed Valerie Howarth, a highly experienced and effective senior manager with a social services background, as CEO to lay the groundwork of the organisation and train its fleet of volunteers. Howarth remained in post for 12 years until her retirement and appointment to the House of Lords in 2001.

Childline merged with the National Society for the Prevention of Cruelty to Children (NSPCC) in February 2006, and extra resources were pledged in an effort to ensure that no child's call would go unanswered.

== UK operations ==
Childline has 12 counselling centres around the UK and one home based team, staffed largely by volunteers. The bases are located in Glasgow, Aberdeen, Manchester, Liverpool, Prestatyn, Birmingham, Nottingham, London, Belfast and Foyle, supported by the online only centres at Leeds and Cardiff and the Virtual Base. A restructure in 2011 saw the closure of the Childline bases in Exeter and Edinburgh, with Swansea relocating to Cardiff. As many as 4,500 phone Childline every day, though only 2,500 of these callers can be answered due to lack of resources. Since the merger with the NSPCC the service has expanded, and depends on public generosity to pay for the phone calls.

Childline raises funds through several channels, including direct donations through the NSPCC, partnerships, events such as The X Factor Childline Ball and through third-party fundraising organisations such as Justgiving.

== Virtual Base ==
Childline's virtual base was started in April 2020 in response to the COVID-19 pandemic. Counsellors in the virtual base answer emails sent by children and young people from their Childline accounts from their own home.

== Childline Scotland ==
Following Childline's merger with NSPCC in 2006, Childline Scotland was run by Children 1st under contract, available to all young people in Scotland up to 18 years of age. It had at that time bases in Glasgow, Aberdeen and Edinburgh. The Edinburgh base has since closed. As of March 2012, Childline Scotland is run directly by the NSPCC. In 2011 the NSPCC in Scotland began to work with partners to introduce new services for children and families.

== International ==
Similar helplines using the name Childline have been formed in a number of countries. As of May 2013 these included Childline Botswana, Childline India, Childline Ireland (Leanbh), チャイルドライン (Japan), Vaikų linija (Lithuania), Childline South Africa, National Child Protection Authority of Sri Lanka, Child Helpline Tanzania, Childline Trinidad and Tobago, as well as organizations in Namibia, Trinidad and Tobago, Gibraltar, Kenya, Zambia, and Zimbabwe. Some of these are independent charities; others have been set up by existing children's charities or more general helplines.

Childline in Ireland is run by the Irish Society for the Prevention of Cruelty to Children (ISPCC). It was set up in 1989. In 2006 a text and online service, in association with Zamano, was established to increase the availability of the listening service for children in Ireland.

Childline Uganda helps people infected and affected by HIV/AIDS live a better life.

== Telephone number ==
The freephone number, 0800 1111, was one of the first 0800 numbers to be issued in the United Kingdom. Before BT allocated this number to Childline, 0800 1111 was used as a test line number by technicians. Other early allocated 0800 numbers were 10 digit, including the prefix. Childline's number is one of only a handful of 8 digit 0800 UK numbers to ever have been allocated and the only one still in use. Calls to the number do not appear on the phone bill.

Childline is also available on the harmonised European number for child helplines, 116111. Young people can also contact Childline through their website, via 1-2-1 counsellor chat, SignVideo, Ask Sam and the 'write an email' feature.

== See also ==
- Child Helpline International
- UNICEF
