= Missing Children Europe =

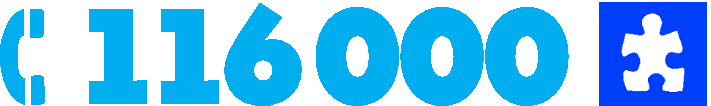
116000 European missing children hotline number and logo.

Missing Children Europe is an organisation which aims to ensure that every EU member state has the necessary procedures and regulations in place to deal with cases of missing and/or sexually exploited children, and are able to both provide support for the victims, and take steps to prevent future disappearances. It is an umbrella organization for 33 NGOs in 27 countries throughout Europe, 32 European countries are running a 116000 hotline for missing children.

== History ==
Missing Children Europe was established in 2001 by Child Focus (Belgium), La Mouette (France), Aurora (Italy), Initiative Vermisste Kinder (Germany) and Rat auf Draht (Austria). Missing Children Europe gained financial independence in 2008, as it obtained a grant from the European Commission.

Missing Children Europe was the driving force behind the launch of 116 000, an emergency number which provides immediate support when children go missing.

== Constituent organizations ==
The 33 NGOs represented by Missing Children Europe are:

- Albania: ALO 116
- Austria: 147 Rat Auf Draht
- Belgium: Child Focus
- Bulgaria: Nadja Centre Foundation
- Croatia: Centre for missing and exploited children
- Cyprus: Consortium: SPAVO, HFC
- Czech Republic: Cesta z krize, z. ů
- Denmark: Børns Vilkår
- Finland: Lasten perusoikeudet, Kaapatut Lapset ry
- France: APEV, Droit d'Enfance - 116000 Enfants Disparus, La Mouette
- Germany: Weißer Ring
- Greece: The Smile of the Child
- Hungary: Kék Vonal
- Ireland: ISPCC
- Italy: SOS II Telefono Azzurro Onlus
- Latvia: Bezvests
- Lithuania: Missing Persons' Families Support Centre
- Poland: ITAKA Foundation
- Portugal: Instituto de Apoio à Criança, APCD
- Romania: Salvati Copiii
- Serbia: Astra
- Slovakia: Linka detskej istoty, n. o.
- Spain: Fundación ANAR
- Switzerland: Missing Children Switzerland, Fondation Suisse du Service Social International
- The Netherlands: The International Child Abduction Centre
- Ukraine: NGO Magnolia
- United Kingdom: Missing People

Missing Children Europe's members are experts in missing children covering prevention, support to missing children and parents, and cooperation with national law enforcement in the search of missing children.

== Funding ==
Missing Children Europe's receives a core operating grant from the European Commission's CERV Programme for its coordination of the 116000 European missing child hotlines network. MCE coordinates EU funded projects under the CERV, JUST, AMIF, and ISF programmes, and further receives project funding on issues of running away, unaccompanied minors, international child abductions and grooming and online sexual exploitation from various foundations. The remainder is collected through fundraising events, structural partnerships and membership fees.

== See also ==
- Refugee children
- Street children
