= 116 000 =

European missing children hotline number

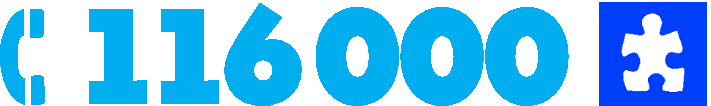
European missing children hotline number and logo

Map of Europe with the countries where 116 000 works marked in blue

116 000 is the European missing children hotline number. It was the first harmonised service of social value to be adopted by the European Union. The 116 000 hotline provides free, immediate life saving support when children go missing.

Calls are answered locally by staff from organisations specialising in dealing with cases of missing children by providing free emotional, psychological, social, administrative and legal advice, as required.

== Coverage ==
It is active in all 27 member states of the European Union as well as in Albania, Serbia, Switzerland, Ukraine and the United Kingdom.

== Purpose ==
A European wide number was reserved by the European Commission for a variety of reasons. First the phenomenon of missing children is becoming increasingly a cross-border problem as the Schengen area is expanding. Secondly swift action in cases of disappearance is of vital importance, as a report from the United States' Office of Juvenile Justice and Delinquency Prevention suggests that 76.2% of children who are murdered after having been abducted are dead within the first three hours of disappearance. Furthermore, parents need the support of an organisation specialised in dealing with these cases. And finally there is a need to communicate about a missing child beyond national borders.

== History ==
The development of an emergency number for missing children that can be dialled anywhere in Europe has been on top of the agenda of Missing Children Europe, the NGO behind the number, since 2005.

On 15 February 2007, the European Commission recognised the need for such a Europe-wide effort and published a document requesting the member states to reserve 116 000 as the number for missing children.

On 25 May 2009, the number was launched in nine member states of Missing Children Europe. It is expected that other Member States will also implement the number, as implementation takes place at a national level.
