= NHS Direct =

Former health advice and information service in England

NHS Direct was the health advice and information service provided by the National Health Service (NHS), established in March 1998. The nurse-led telephone information service provided residents and visitors in England with healthcare advice 24 hours a day, every day of the year through telephone contact on the national non-geographic 0845 46 47 number. The programme also provided web based symptom checkers on the NHS Direct website and via mobile, both as apps for iPhone and Android smart phones and a mobile website.

It was discontinued on 31 March 2014 and replaced by NHS 111. As a part of the National Health Service, NHS Direct services were free, although the 0845 number was usually chargeable as a non-geographic number. Some landline providers allowed 0845 calls within "inclusive" minutes.

Users of the service, through whichever channel, were asked questions about their symptoms or problem. Common problems were often given simple self care advice, which they could follow, thereby avoiding an expensive visit to a health care professional. More complex problems were assessed by a nurse and could then be given treatment advice or referred on to another service within the NHS.

As well as these core services, NHS Direct provided a number of commissioned services throughout the NHS, such as specialised support for patients with long term conditions, access to GP and dental healthcare out of hours, and a professional response system for times of public health anxiety.

NHS Direct only provided its service for residents and visitors in England, and there are corresponding public services covering Scotland (NHS 24) and Wales (NHS Direct Wales). Northern Ireland does not have such a service.

== Health and symptomatic advice ==
NHS Direct's core service was the provision of health advice to the public through the national telephone service or through digital channels including the website.

=== Telephone service ===
In England and Wales, the NHS Direct telephone service was available on 0845 46 47 and was run by a specially trained team of information handlers and healthcare professionals, including nurses and dental nurses. The service was equipped to deal with a huge range of health enquiries, from symptomatic queries that require assessment and treatment, to requests for local healthcare services and healthy living advice.

Every person that called NHS Direct feeling unwell was assessed to establish the severity of their symptoms, so as to re-route any urgent or life-threatening situations to the emergency services as quickly as possible.

Other symptomatic callers were able to speak to a nurse practitioner, who asked about their condition in order to recommend the best course of action. This could be giving advice about treating the problem at home, suggesting a visit to a pharmacist, or advising an appointment with their GP, which, if in the out of hours period (when the GP surgeries are closed), could possibly be arranged over the phone.

As many callers were advised to look after their symptoms at home without seeing their GP, the NHS Direct telephone service reduced the demand on NHS resources and helped to avoid unnecessary trips to the doctor, dentist and accident and emergency department.

The NHS Direct telephone service also provided a confidential interpreter service in many different languages, which could be accessed by stating the language required when the call was answered. For those who are deaf or hard of hearing, there was a textphone service available on 0845 606 4647.

=== Website ===
The NHS Direct website had a variety of symptom checkers, based on the same system used on the telephone service and could either give self care advice or direct a user to another NHS service. For more complex queries, the symptom checkers allowed the user to receive a call back from a nurse or to take part in a webchat for further information and help.

All NHS Direct health advice and information on the website passed through a rigorous clinical check by medical professionals before it was published.

Non-urgent health queries could be submitted to the NHS Direct online enquiry service and the website also offered a confidential webchat service for those needing advice about unprotected sex or emergency contraception.

=== Mobile services ===
NHS Direct offered its full range of symptom checkers optimised for mobile devices on its mobile website and also launched stand alone 'apps' for iPhone and Android smart phones, both available in the normal app stores.

== Other services ==
=== Digital television channel ===
NHS Direct provided an interactive TV service via Sky Interactive until 31 March 2009, when the service was closed.

The Freeview service, on channel 100 is now hosted by NHS Choices.

The digital television service contained condensed versions of many of the most common and popular health encyclopedia topics and common health questions.

=== Commissioned services ===
Although it is not well known, NHS Direct supplies a multitude of additional commissioned services within the NHS.

NHS Direct supported many local health authorities in England, including primary care trusts (PCTs), helping them to deliver high-quality healthcare to people in each region.

These services ranged from dedicated projects in particular areas, such as the local telephone helpline set up for Sandwell PCT after a dental health scare, to schemes that were developed nationwide. These include a telephone-based pre and post-operative assessment for patients having surgery, and allocating care managers to give regular coaching and advice to those with long term conditions, such as diabetes and cardiovascular disease.

== History and background ==
NHS Direct was launched in 1998 after the government identified a need for a telephone health advice line staffed by nurses as part of its plans to modernise the NHS.

The aim of NHS Direct, as stated by the government in the NHS White Paper, The New NHS, was "to provide people at home with easier and faster advice and information about health, illness, and the NHS, so that they are better able to care for themselves and their families".

The NHS Direct telephone service began taking calls in three contact centres in Lancashire, Northumbria and Milton Keynes in March 1998. These original sites were set up as pilots but soon proved successful, reaching over 1 million people and earning highly positive feedback. Additional waves of pilots were established in contact centres around England until the whole country was covered by the NHS Direct telephone service in 2000.

NHS Direct added a website to its services at the end of 1999, allowing users to find clinically accurate health advice and information anonymously. Since its creation, the NHS Direct website was steadily improved and developed, attracting more users. By 2008, there were over 1.5 million visitors to the website every month. NHS Direct's services continued to expand and improve. It had been said that this has made the organisation "the largest and most successful healthcare provider of its kind, anywhere in the world".

It was reported that each call made to NHS Direct cost £25 to answer - an earlier official report had put the total at £16.

In April 2007, NHS Direct became an NHS Trust, giving it the opportunity to apply for foundation trust status.

In August 2010, the BBC reported that David Cameron's coalition government was planning to scrap the NHS Direct 0845 46 47 helpline telephone service in favour of the cheaper NHS 111 number. This intention was set out in the white paper, but was portrayed in the media as a 'leak' by the Conservative Health Secretary Andrew Lansley. The service was shut down on 26 March 2014. A copy of the website was archived a few weeks before the official closedown.

== Replacement in England ==
It was announced in October 2013 that NHS Direct would be closed down in 2014, following three pilots in the North East, East Midlands and East of England. NHS 111 was intended to work in an integrated way with local GPs, out-of-hours services, ambulance services and hospitals, for the benefit of patients and to help the NHS become more efficient. NHS Direct was intended to have an ongoing role, along with other providers, in helping to deliver the NHS 111 Service and, in the interim, continued providing local and national telephone and web-based services on behalf of its commissioners. after the organisation became entangled in and failed to deliver correctly a number of contracts to deliver NHS 111.
