= NSPCC =

British child protection charity

The National Society for the Prevention of Cruelty to Children

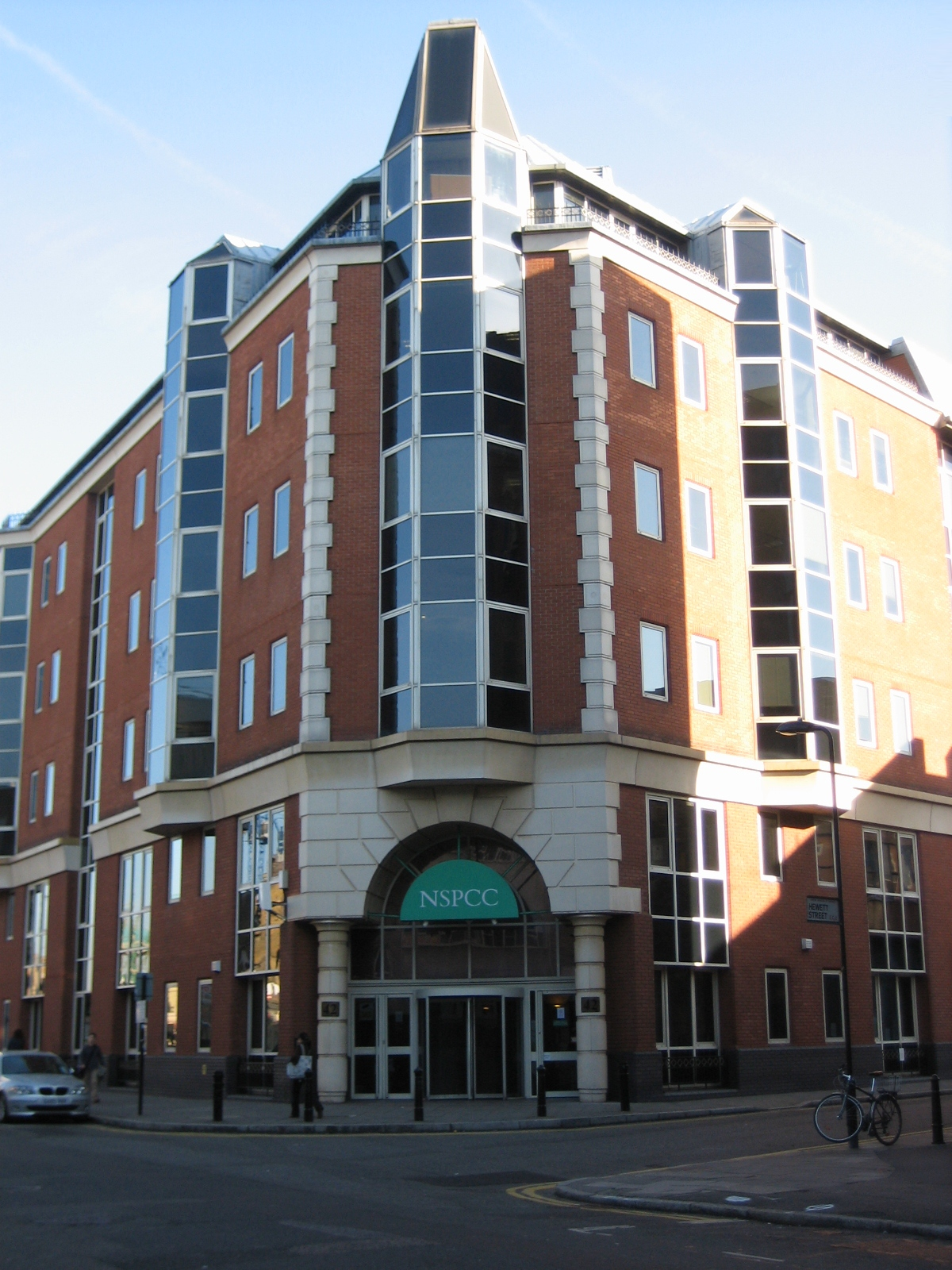
- Founded: 1884; 142 years ago (as the London Society for the Prevention of Cruelty to Children)
- Registration no.: 216401
- Location: London, United Kingdom
- Coordinates: 51.5233°N 0.0802°W
- Region served: United Kingdom and the Channel Islands
- Key people: Emma Scott (Chair); Christopher Sherwood (CEO)
- Revenue: £118 Million
- Employees: Approx. 2,500
- Volunteers: 1,700
- Website: nspcc.org.uk
- Formerly called: Liverpool Society for the Prevention of Cruelty to Children (LSPCC)

The National Society for the Prevention of Cruelty to Children (NSPCC) is a British child protection charity founded as the London Society for the Prevention of Cruelty to Children (LSPCC) by Thomas Agnew on 19 April 1883. The NSPCC lobbies the government on issues relating to child welfare, and creates child abuse public awareness campaigns.

Since the 1980s, the charity has had statutory powers allowing it to apply for help on behalf of children at risk. In the 1990s, the charity's publication, Satanic Indicators, fuelled panic in social workers who went and accused parents and removed children from homes when they should not have. It also operates a telephone help line. The Paddington Bear character has partnered with the charity to raise funds.

== History ==
=== Victorian era ===
On a business trip to New York in 1881, Liverpudlian fine arts dealer Thomas Agnew (1827–1883) was inspired by a visit to the New York Society for the Prevention of Cruelty to Children. On his return to Liverpool, he invited leading figures from the town to a town hall meeting and founded the Liverpool Society for the Prevention of Cruelty to Children (LSPCC) on 19 April 1883. Similar societies were subsequently set up around the country, such as the London Society for the Prevention of Cruelty to Children (London SPCC), founded on 8 July 1884 by Anthony Ashley-Cooper. Ashley-Cooper was the first president of the London SPCC, with Reverends Benjamin Waugh and Edward Rudolph as joint secretaries. 1st Baroness Angela Burdett-Coutts was one of the co-founder of the organisation which later became the National Society for the Prevention of Cruelty to Children (NSPCC) in 1889 with Queen Victoria as the patron.

On 1 January 1887, the Child's Guardian, the official magazine of the society was launched. The magazine was modelled on the Royal Society for the Prevention of Cruelty to Animals and was designed to educate the public on the nature of cruelty to children.

After five years of campaigning by the London SPCC, Parliament passed the first ever UK law to protect children from abuse and neglect in 1889. The London SPCC was renamed the National Society for the Prevention of Cruelty to Children on 14 May 1889, because by then it had branches across Great Britain and Ireland. In the same year the Chief Commissioners of the Metropolitan and City of London Police issued instructions that all cases of cruelty to children reported to them should be handed to NSPCC to be dealt with.

The NSPCC was granted its Royal Charter on 28 May 1895 by Queen Victoria who became its first royal patron. It did not change its title to "Royal Society for the Prevention of Cruelty to Children" or similar, as the name NSPCC was already well established, and to avoid confusion with the Royal Society for the Prevention of Cruelty to Animals (RSPCA), which had already existed for more than fifty years.

=== 20th century ===
In 1901, King Edward VII and his wife Queen Alexandra became patrons of the society upon the death of Queen Victoria. In 1905, Reverend Benjamin Waugh retired from the Directorship of the society, as a result of failing health, after 21 years' of service. In 1910, King George V and his wife Queen Mary became patrons of the society upon the death of King Edward VII.

Shortly after the outbreak of the First World War, 18 Inspectors joined the Royal Navy and a further 42 joined the Army. During the course of the war, the NSPCC inspector for Manchester was awarded the Victoria Cross. In January 1915, the NSPCC appointed its first Female Inspector. During the same War, fraudulent fundraisers were discovered to be collecting money in aid of families of those killed or injured in action. The NSPCC, therefore, avoided street collections until the War Charities Act of 1916, which introduced regulations to protect and guide collectors.

In 1919, the Prince of Wales, later to be King Edward VIII, became a patron of the society. In 1926 the Prince spoke on behalf of the NSPCC in a radio appeal.

In 1930, the society reported helping its four-millionth child.

Shortly after the outbreak of the Second World War the home secretary, Sir John Anderson, wrote to the chairman of the society expressing his thanks that the society had decided to continue its work during the war. During the course of the war, the society supported over 600,000 children, while nearly 100 of the society's inspectors served in the Armed Forces.

In 1943, Princess Elizabeth, later to be Queen Elizabeth II, became president of the society before switching to patron in 1953. She was succeeded as president by Princess Margaret.

The NSPCC's organisation in the Republic of Ireland was taken up by the Irish Society for the Prevention of Cruelty to Children (ISPCC), founded in 1956 as a replacement for the NSPCC. Today, the NSPCC works in England, Wales, Northern Ireland, Scotland, and the Channel Islands.

==== 1980s ====
The NSPCC is the only UK charity which has been granted statutory powers under the Children Act 1989, allowing it to apply for care and supervision orders for children at risk. In 1983, the NSPCC launched its centenary appeal in Britain in order to "establish 60 child protection teams across the country." The launch of the appeal occurred during a time when the organization was struggling because of an insufficient amount of public support and government funds. To help advertise for the NSPCC, a poster was created that highlighted the faces of two abused children, one from 1884 and the other from 1984. The message that was written along with the picture was "The faces change, the bruises don't."

==== 1990s ====
The NSPCC documented allegations of Satanic ritual abuse in 1990, with the publication of survey findings that, of 66 child protection teams in England, Wales and Northern Ireland, 14 teams had received reports of ritual abuse from children and seven of them were working directly with children who had been ritually abused, sometimes in groups of twenty. An investigation, by the British government, into SRA allegations produced over two hundred reports, of which only three were substantiated and proved to be examples of pseudosatanic abuse, in which sexual abuse was the actual motivation and the rituals were incidental.

The NSPCC also provided a publication known as Satanic Indicators to social services around the country that has been blamed for some social workers panicking and making false accusations of sexually abusing children. The most prominent of these cases was in Rochdale in 1990 when up to twenty children were taken from their homes and parents after social services believed them to be involved in satanic or occult ritual abuse. The allegations were later found to be false. The case was the subject of a BBC documentary which featured recordings of the interviews made by NSPCC social workers, revealing that flawed techniques and leading questions were used to gain evidence of abuse from the children. The documentary claimed that the social services were wrongly convinced, by organisations such as the NSPCC, that abuse was occurring and so rife that they made allegations before any evidence was considered.

In 1999, an advert released by the NSPCC "warning" of the risk of children being murdered by strangers was criticised as a fearmongering fundraising tactic, as such occurrences are exceedingly uncommon.

=== 21st century ===
==== 2010s ====
In 2011, the NSPCC launched its All Babies Count campaign to highlight the vulnerability of babies and calling for better and earlier support for new parents. In 2012, the charity won a PRCA award for its "Don't Wait Until You're Certain" campaign that encouraged people to call the NSPCC with any worry about a child.

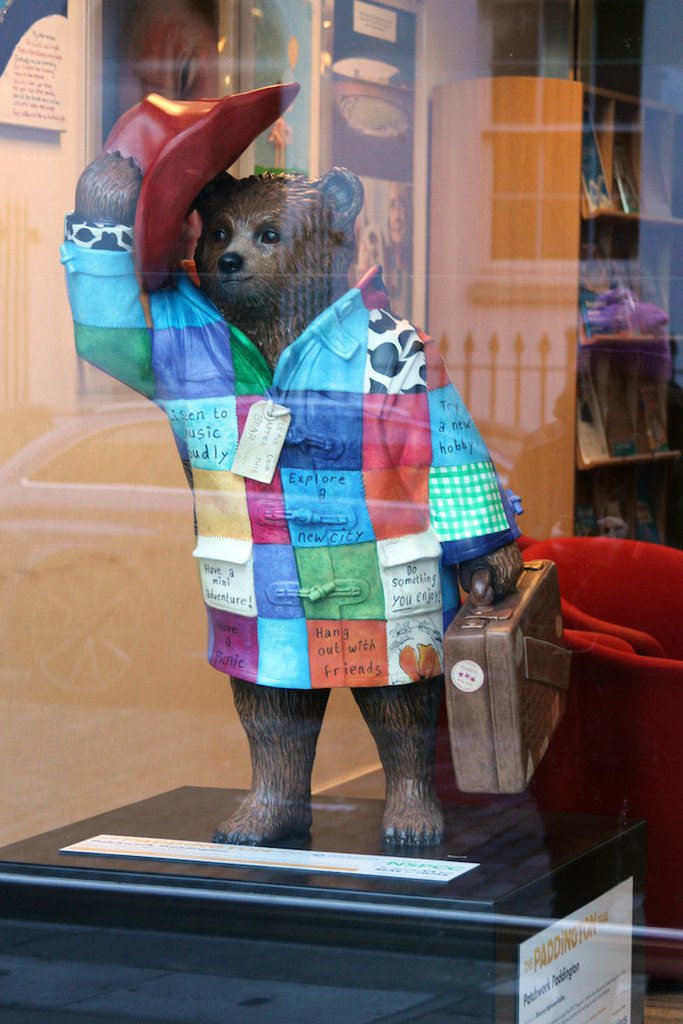
Paddington Bear statue designed by an employee at the NSPCC, on display at the Childline offices in London, which was auctioned to raise funds for the NSPCC

In November 2014, fifty Paddington Bear statues, created by various celebrities and organisations—including the NSPCC designed "Patchwork Paddington"—were located around London prior to the release of the film Paddington, with the statues auctioned to raise funds for the NSPCC.

In 2017, the Information Commissioner's Office fined eleven charities that breached the Data Protection Act by misusing donors' personal data. NSPCC was fined £12,000.

In 2019, the NSPCC engaged transgender activist Munroe Bergdorf as its first LGBTQ+ campaigner for ChildLine. The relationship was ended controversially after what Bergdorf described as a transphobic hate campaign against her, including false allegations that she had taken part in pornographic films. The NSPCC stated that their reason was nothing to do with Bergdorf being transgender, but because she invited LGBTQ+ young people to contact her directly over social media, which was not compatible with the NSPCC's own safeguarding policies. Over 150 NSPCC staff complained to senior management about the charity's treatment of Bergdorf.

== Activities ==
The NSPCC lobbies the government on issues relating to child welfare, and creates campaigns for the general public, with the intention of raising awareness of child protection issues. It also operates both a helpline on 0808 800 5000, for anyone concerned about a child, and Childline offering support to children themselves. Childline became a part of the NSPCC in 2006. In addition to the telephone helplines, NSPCC provides an online counselling service for children and young people at Childline.

The NSPCC runs local service centres across the UK where it helps children, young people, and families. Since 2009, the NSPCC has run a Child Protection Consultancy service aiming to make organisations safer for children. This offers training and consultancy to organisations which have contact with children, ranging from schools to sporting bodies. The charity works through local safeguarding children's boards (LSCBs), where the police, health, social and education services and others can work together.

The charity is regularly audited and publishes its annual report and accounts as required by the Charity Commission.

The NSPCC also makes public service announcements, and has been doing so since 1991, the same year the UK lifted the ban on charities from advertising on television.

In May 2021, a helpline that was launched for victims to report abuse and harassment in educational settings had taken hundreds of calls since it opened. The NSPCC received 353 calls between 1 April and 16 May. Of these, 65 were referred to external agencies such as the police and children's services.

== Research and evidence ==
In 2009, the NSPCC launched a new seven year strategy. The strategy reaffirmed the society's vision of ending cruelty to children in the UK. It was suggested that policy, influencing and campaigning work, combined with the experience of working directly with young people could help deliver this vision. Learning was to be at the core of the society's work. The ambition was to subject all of the organisation's direct services to an evaluation and then roll out effective interventions to mainstream service providers. In 2016 the society's new six year strategy pledged to continue generating evidence of 'what works' in preventing child sexual abuse.

In 2016, the NSPCC launched a web-based 'Impact and Evidence' hub which was designed to promote and make accessible the research evidence that it produced. The hub contained sections on:

- Research and evaluation reports.
- Information about how evaluations were carried out by the NSPCC, including information about the outcome measures used.
- A series of blog articles recounting the experiences of professionals in running research articles and producing evidence.
- Information about the organisation's Research Ethics Committee and the process of ethical review to which research projects needed to be subject.

Research and evidence reports produced by the NSPCC include evaluations of:

- A video interaction guidance intervention with families where initial concerns about neglect have been noted.
- A therapeutic intervention for children affected by sexual abuse and their carers.
- An intervention designed to support infant mental health.
- An early intervention programme designed to enhance a mother's relationship with her baby.
- A parenting programme helping fathers change their behaviour after domestic abuse.
- An intervention helping mothers rebuild relationships with their children after domestic abuse.
- An intervention helping parents with drug or alcohol problems improve their parenting skills.
- An exploratory approach to working with community members to eliminate child sexual abuse.

== See also ==
- Internet Watch Foundation
- Kidscape
- The Children's Society
- Timeline of young people's rights in the United Kingdom

== Bibliography ==
- Susan J. Creighton, "Organized Abuse: The NSPCC Experience", Child Abuse Review; Volume 2, Issue 4 (1993), p. 232–242.
- Jean La Fontaine, The Extent and Nature of Organised and Ritual Sexual Abuse of Children, HMSO, 1994.
- Jean La Fontaine, Speak of the Devil: Tales of Satanic Abuse in Contemporary England, Cambridge University Press, 1998.
- Department of Health and Social Services Inspectorate. North West Region, Inspection of child protection services in Rochdale, Greater Manchester: Social Services Inspectorate. North West Region, 1990, viii, 33pp.
- Clyde, James J., The report of the inquiry into the removal of children from Orkney in February 1991, Edinburgh: HMSO, 1992, xiv, 363pp. ISBN 0-10-219593-5.
- Department of Health and Social Security and Welsh Office, Working Together: a guide to arrangements for inter-agency co-operation for the protection of children from abuse, London: HMSO, 1988, 72pp. ISBN 0-11-321154-6.
- Eleanor Stobart, Child abuse linked to accusations of "possession" and "witchcraft", Nottingham: Department for Education and Skills, 2006.
