= NHS 111 =

UK number for non-emergency medical advice

- Type: Telehealth / Telehomecare
- Established: August 2010; 16 years ago (initial trials)
- Region served: England
- Website: 111.nhs.uk

111 is a free-to-call single non-emergency number medical helpline operating in England, Scotland and Wales. The 111 phone service has replaced the various non-geographic 0845 rate numbers and is part of each country's National Health Service: in England the service is known as NHS 111; in Scotland, NHS 24; and in Wales, NHS 111 Wales.

== History ==
The transition from NHS Direct (0845 4647) to NHS 111 in England was completed during February 2014 with NHS 24 Scotland (08454 24 24 24) following during April 2014. NHS Direct Wales started a phased roll-out of a similar 111 service in late 2016 and completed it in March 2022.

As of June 2018, the 111 number was not in use across Northern Ireland. The NHS 111 service was extended to Northern Ireland from February 2020, although this is for advice relating to the COVID-19 virus only. After dialling, callers will be asked to follow prompts to determine what nation they are calling from.

The service is available 24 hours a day, every day of the year and is intended for 'urgent but not life-threatening' health issues and complements the long-established 999 emergency telephone number for more serious matters, although 111 operators in England are able to dispatch ambulances when appropriate using the NHS Pathways triage system.

=== Origins and development ===
During 2007, the Department of Health's Our NHS, Our Future report identified confusion surrounding access to certain NHS services in England and suggested the introduction of a national, three-digit number for out-of-hours healthcare services could help simplify the situation. Arrangements to identify and secure a suitable non-emergency number for England began in July 2009, with the number 111 allocated by telecommunications regulator Ofcom in December of that year.

In late August 2010, the Conservative-Liberal Democrat coalition government proposed that 111 would replace the existing NHS Direct (084546 47) telephone helpline in England. This suggestion proved controversial as some critics feared that NHS 111 would be a "cut-price" replacement for NHS Direct, because NHS 111 would be staffed mainly by telephone advisors whereas NHS Direct had been staffed by nurses. Health Secretary Andrew Lansley said that the only major change would be the phone number, and that the service would be provided by existing staff.

In July 2015 NHS England decided that what was required was an integrated urgent care access, treatment and clinical advice service which would operate over a large area. Clinical Commissioning Groups were told to stop any procurement exercises until revised commissioning standards and supporting procurement advice for integrated services were produced. These service specifications for England were published in 2017.

In June 2020 it was announced that there were plans to integrate LIVI software into the service in three regions of the UK.

=== 111 First ===
The 111 First system, which allows patients not in medical emergencies to call 111 to "book" urgent care, was launched in 2020, as a response to the impact of COVID-19 pandemic in England on emergency services. In July 2021 Healthwatch England found that it had potential to be a useful service, but the public "don't really know what it's for". They said the messaging from the NHS "has not been strong enough". Only 3% of English A&E attendances in June 2021 were "booked" in advance via NHS 111. The figure was similar in February 2022. According to Healthwatch England people "really welcome" the opportunity to book emergency appointments via 111, provided they know about it.

== Management ==
In England, the service is accountable at a Clinical Commissioning Group level but was originally commissioned on a regional basis, with a number of service providers. NHS Direct staff provided some of the 111 service during the original launch of the number, with other providers including regional ambulance trusts, and out-of-hours GP providers.

The lack of clarity as to accountability was criticised in a Deloitte report into the service launch failure by NHS Direct. As of December 2013 all NHS Direct contracts are being serviced by "stability partner" organisations such as ambulance trusts or GP co-operative organisations.

The service operates 24 hours a day. When GP surgeries are closed normally between 18:30 and 08:00, at weekends and at Bank Holidays the service will refer many patients to an out-of-hours service. This can also happen if practices are closed for training purposes.

The service uses a clinical decision support system which structures the response to a call, which may range from telephone advice to the dispatch of an emergency ambulance. Calls are initially assessed by a call handler and may be passed to a clinician. The service has been criticised for being too cautious and directing too many patients to A&E departments. GPs have complained that the service has not been inspected by the Care Quality Commission and that it may jeopardise the safety of out-of-hours services.

Between 2010 and 2015 the service has handled 24 million calls with an average call length of 14 minutes. Although 111 is a helpline for non-emergency cases, 10% of calls trigger the dispatch of an ambulance - 93,000 in the 12 months from April 2014 to April 2015. A 2017 article in the British Medical Journal that studied the performance of the 111 service concluded that patients were "largely satisfied" with the service, while "its success against some key criteria has not been comprehensively proven." Of calls answered by NHS 111 in March 2021, 78.2% were answered within 60 seconds. In March 2020 the figure was 30.2%.

In January 2020 the Association of Ambulance Chief Executives called for a more joined up approach to the commissioning of 111, urgent care and ambulance services. The lead commissioner for 999 services is generally different, as those services operate over a wider area. The associations wants single regional specifications for integrated 999 and 111 provision, with no new tendering of 111 contracts which end this financial year. They want contracts for at least five-year terms.

West Midlands Ambulance Service took on the service across most of the West Midlands in 2019 but withdrew from the contract in 2022. NHS England is moving to larger geographical areas, advocating single virtual contact centres, allowing for calls to be answered quicker by utilising spare capacity across the country.

== Launch and initial service failures ==
The first NHS 111 trial, in County Durham and Darlington, started on 23 August 2010. Nottingham, Lincolnshire and Luton began trialling the service later that year.

NHS 111 was launched in a limited number of regions in March 2013 ahead of a planned national launch in April 2013. The British Medical Association wrote to the Secretary of State for Health to request that the launch be postponed. Its chair, Dr Laurence Buckman, warned that the service as "a disaster in the making", and recommended delaying the full launch for safety reasons. The public sector trade union UNISON also recommended delaying the full launch.

The initial launch was widely reported to be a failure. On its introduction, the service was unable to cope with demand; technical failures and inadequate staffing levels led to severe delays in response (up to five hours), resulting in high levels of use of alternative services such as ambulances and emergency departments. The problems led to the launch being delayed in South West England, London and The Midlands and the service was suspended one month after its launch in Worcestershire.

The NHS 111 service was gradually launched in England over the course of 2013, with the rollout being completed in February 2014. It was announced in October 2013 that NHS Direct would be closed down in 2014. The 111 number was launched in Scotland in April 2014.

== Coverage ==
The 111 number for NHS services is currently available in all of England, Wales and Scotland. Coverage was extended to include crisis mental health support in 2024.

As of early 2020, the NHS 111 service is available in Northern Ireland for advice relating to the COVID-19 outbreak.

NHS 111 online is a triage system also available for members of the public aged 5 or over in England, owned by the Department for Health and Social Care, commissioned by NHSX and developed and delivered by NHS Digital. It used the NHS Pathways series of algorithms.

== Coronavirus ==
During the pandemic, NHS England asked people with suspected COVID-19 infection to call 111. This was intended to reduce the risk of hospitals being overwhelmed by huge numbers of people who did not need to see a healthcare professional. An analysis by Yorkshire Ambulance Service showed that 111 triage has similar accuracy to the triage used in emergency departments and urgent care settings for other conditions suggesting it could be a good option for future pandemics. Portions of the service were outsourced to Serco, Sitel, and Teleperformance, resulting in uneven service quality and an inability to record calls for feedback.

A separate number NHS 119 is used for information and services relating to COVID-19 as of 18 May 2020. This number operates in England, Wales, and Northern Ireland, with lines being open from 07:00 to 23:00 hours. It allows people to book NHS drive through tests, order home testing kits, and apply for tests in a care facility.

In Scotland, 0300 303 2713 is the non-geographical telephone number instead of 119.

== European number ==
Within certain EU member states and territories a similar type of service may be available via the harmonised European number for medical advice 116 117 as one of a number of optional 'Harmonised Services of Social Value'.

== Cyber attack ==
On 4 August 2022 at 07:00, Adastra, the computer system used by 85% of NHS 111 services was removed from service after a ransomware attack. As of 11 August 2022, the service had not yet been restored with some question as to whether patient data had been exfiltrated. On 23 August 2022, London Ambulance Service was reported to be the first service to return to use of Adastra after the cyber-attack, with no clarification of patient data leakage during the incident.
