= NHS Pathways =

Triage software used by the National Health Service

- Developer: NHS Digital
- Stable release: February 2025 / NHS Pathways Update: v47.2
- Website: digital.nhs.uk/services/nhs-pathways

NHS Pathways is a triage software utilised by the National Health Service of England to triage public telephone calls for medical care and emergency medical services – such as 999 or 111 calls – in some NHS trusts and seven of the ambulance services in the country. In its emergency capacity, it has replaced the Advanced Medical Priority Dispatch System for some trusts, and in non-emergency telephone triage it is found in many medical care triage systems, such as NHS 111.

The system, born from a desire to reduce unnecessary call-outs for emergency services, and to reduce the instances of patients rebounding between care providers due to repeated re-triage, is designed to triage any health problem and refer to the appropriate service either within or without the service undertaking the triage. With an attached Capacity Management System, NHS Pathways is designed to factor in what services are available local to the patient when supplying care provision. In essence, the intention is that any health care problem can be triaged by any arm of the NHS – emergency or non-emergency – and can be directed to any possible health care provider without the need for a second triage on referral, or any delay.

== Mechanism of triage ==
As with many triage systems, NHS Pathways operates on a diagnosis of exclusion, excluding conditions based on a set of triage questions developed by senior clinicians at NHS Digital. Upon arriving at an illness or injury that cannot be excluded, the system directs the patient to the appropriate level of care for that condition. Theoretically, patients will receive a higher level of care than their actual condition warrants on occasion, but should never receive a lower level. Unlike previous triage systems, in an emergency capacity NHS Pathways can lead the patient to doctor, nurse, emergency department, or home-care advice dispositions, whereas previous systems often merely led to various levels of ambulance response. The lack of such care providers in an area also highlights gaps in services for the NHS to review.

== Current usage ==
NHS Pathways is currently utilised in nine of the eleven English ambulance services:

- North East Ambulance Service 999 and 111
- South East Coast Ambulance Service 999 and 111
- West Midlands Ambulance Service 999 and 111
- Isle of Wight NHS Trust 999 and 111
- South Central Ambulance Service 999 and 111
- North West Ambulance Service 999 and 111
- Yorkshire Ambulance Service 999 and 111
- London Ambulance Service 111
- East Midlands Ambulance Service 999 and 111

In addition, all NHS 111 providers including: Vocare, Practice Plus Group (PPG), IC24, DHU Healthcare and HUC, use the NHS Pathways System to assess NHS 111 Calls in England.

== History ==
NHS Pathways evolved following reports by the National Audit Office (NAO) into the inconsistency of 'hear and treat' statistics across the ambulance services of the United Kingdom. In June 2011 it was approved by the NAO "as a way to make substantial savings and improve efficiency in ambulance services." Its development was intended to coincide with – and be integrated into – the growth of the new non-emergency healthcare system NHS 111. By October 2011, the Department of Health announced plans to extend NHS 111 – and Pathways – across the UK by 2013 to replace NHS Direct. Its role in emergency medicience received media coverage from the BBC that focused on the hope that it would reduce unnecessary ambulance dispatches as an improvement on the existing AMPDS or criteria-based dispatch systems. The North East Ambulance Service, already using NHS Pathways, declared that it reduced such call outs by 2,000 per month. Using an attached capacity management system (CMS) NHS Pathways can analyse the medical services local to each caller, and thus direct the patient to nearby minor injury units or doctor's surgeries depending on the presenting condition. The NHS launched Pathways with the example of an adult female with an arm laceration who – upon being triaged by NHS Pathways via NHS 111 – was directed to a minor injuries unit one mile from her home that was identified by the CMS function of NHS Pathways as being suitable. In theory, any patient with any medical condition can contact any telephone-based medical care provider (999, NHS 111, out-of-hours GP) and be directed to any care pathway, be it ambulance, doctor, nurse, or emergency department, using one system. In June 2020 it was reported that NHS Pathways had made more than 300,000 referrals since its launch and that its algorithms had been updated to reflect the need for patients with COVID-19 symptoms to be referred to the NHS 111 Covid Clinical Assessment Service. This in turn also ensured that patients with non-COVID-19 symptoms, where clinically appropriate, could be referred the Community Pharmacist Consultation Service (CPCS). In August 2020, it emerged that NHS111 online experienced record usage with more than 30 million users visiting NHS111 online between 26 February and 11 August 2020, due to the Covid pandemic. Its newly introduced dashboard, based on the volume of triages going through NHS Pathways, proved itself as a valuable indicator for getting early warnings about potential local outbreaks. NHS111 online became a reliable and trusted source of NHS and government guidance on the pandemic, also connecting the public to additional digital services related to coronavirus, such as the issue of isolation notes or sending text messages to support patients who were managing their illness at home. In October 2021, having dealt with almost 20,000 suspected cardiac arrest patients, it emerged that NHS Pathways was well equipped to identify cardiac arrests and escalating priority of ambulance response, as well as instructing and supporting members of the public in administering CPR successfully, considerably increasing the patient's chance of survival.
