= 105 (telephone number) =

Single non-emergency phone number

105 is a government-service telephone number in several countries. It is the emergency telephone number in Mongolia, and it is a single non-emergency number in the United Kingdom, New Zealand and Belgium.

In the United Kingdom, it connects to the caller's local distribution network operator, and is primarily marketed for reporting power cuts. In New Zealand, it is used to contact the police in general non-emergency situations. In Belgium, the telephone number is used to reach the Belgian Red Cross ambulance service.

== In the United Kingdom ==
Prior to the launch of the single number in 2016, people wishing to contact the relevant electric distribution company would have needed to know the 11-digit phone number of the electricity distribution company who served their area. Industry research following winter storms in 2013/2014 showed that most people in the event of a power cut would contact their electricity supplier (who sources or generates the electricity and bills the consumer) rather than the network operator (who is responsible for delivering power from the National Grid).

== In New Zealand ==
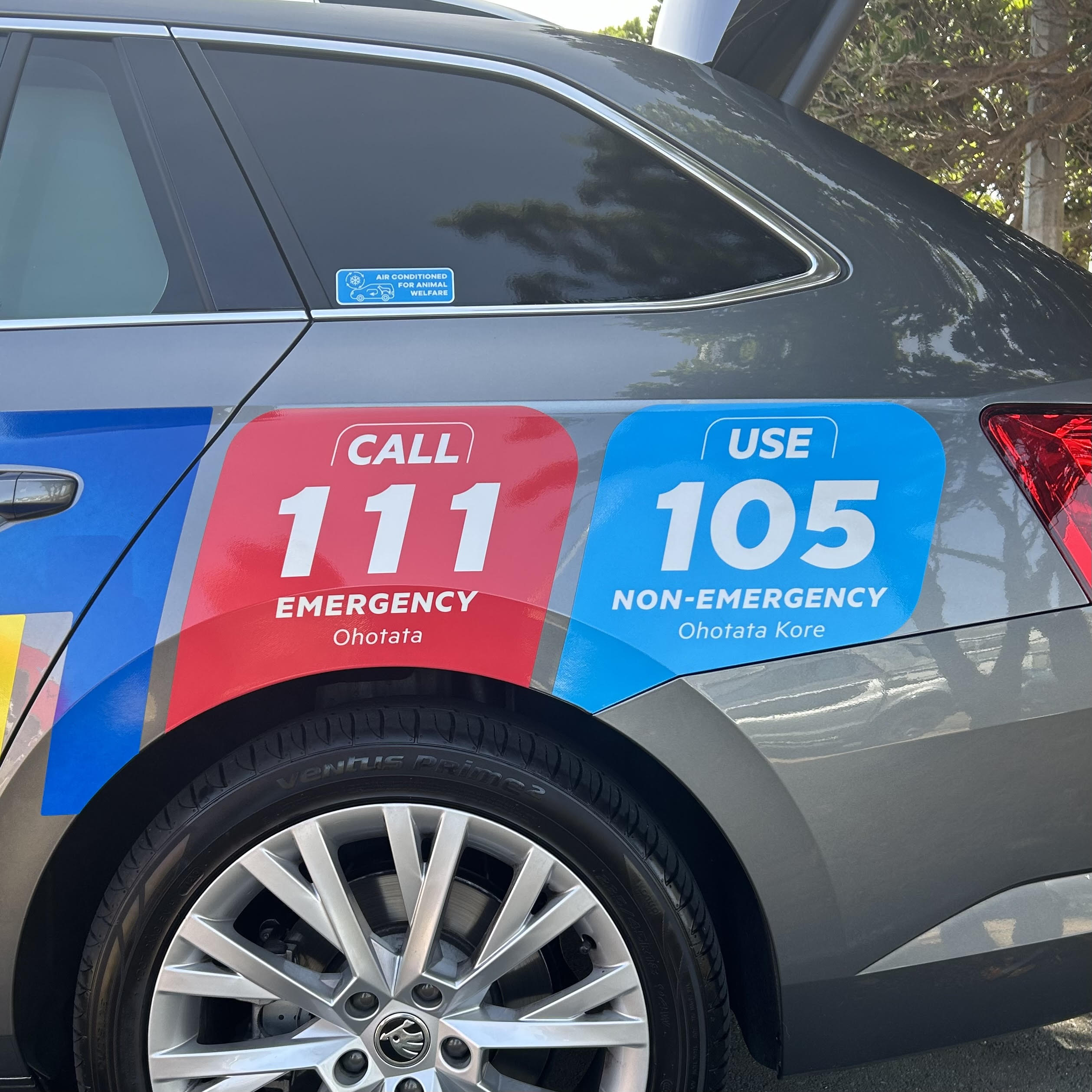
New Zealand Police Skoda Superb highlighting 111-105 information

Launched on 10 May 2019, 105 is used for non-emergency calls to Police where an immediate response is not required or when the event has already taken place and nobody is in any danger, such as a stolen car, property damage, to add additional information to an existing police report or to contact the local police station. It is the analogue of the 101 telephone number in the UK.

An alternative landline number, +64 4 9105105, can be used to access the 105 service from overseas.

In 2021 the New Zealand Police added 111 emergency and 105 non-emergency to the side of their new vehicles livery to promote the use of the 105 number.

== In Belgium ==
The non-emergency ambulance service of the Belgian Red Cross can be reached by dialing 105 in Flanders, Wallonia and Brussels.

== See also ==
- Electricity sector in the United Kingdom
- 101 (telephone number)
- 111 (emergency telephone number)
- 999 (emergency telephone number)
