= R (Watts) v Bedford Primary Care Trust =

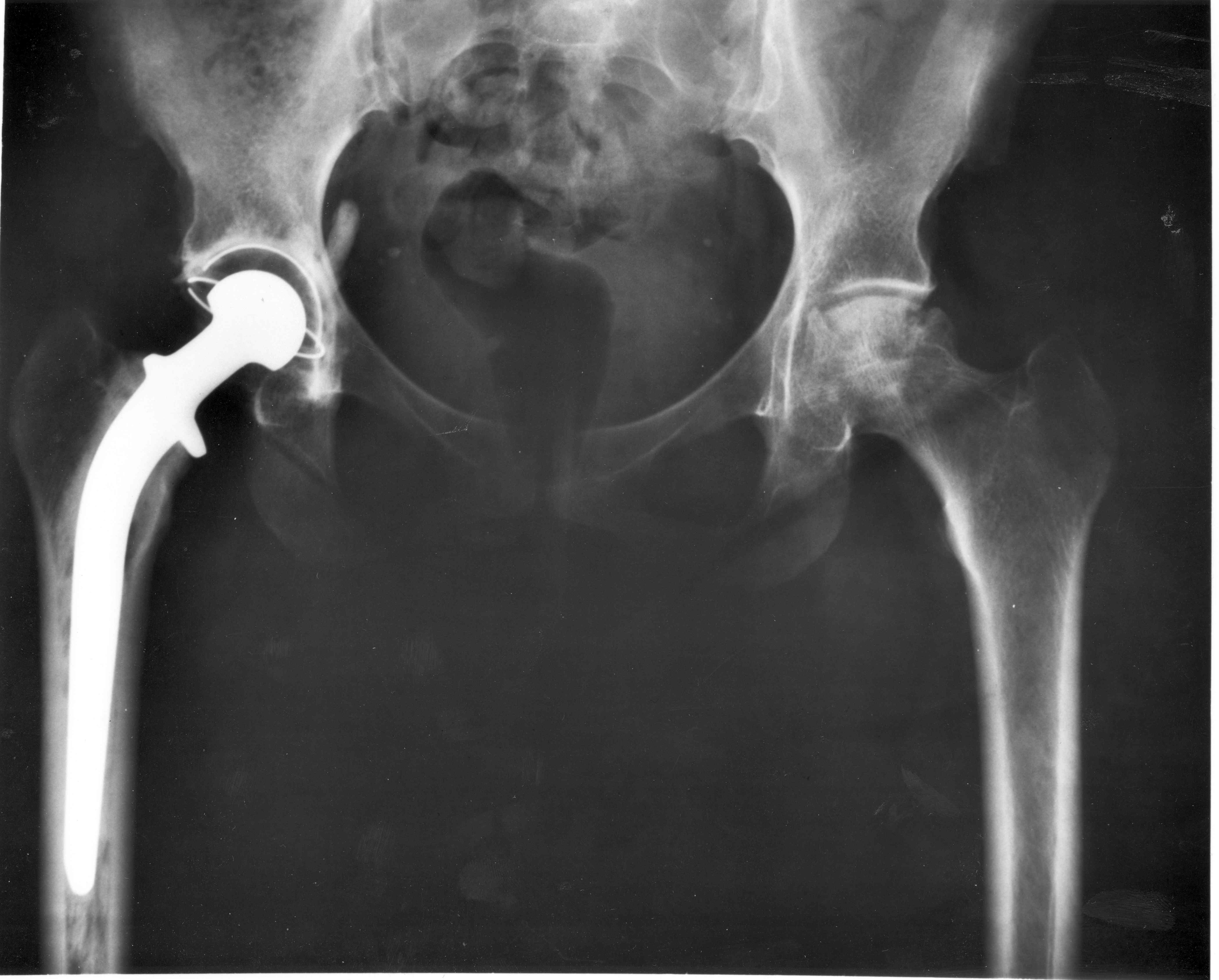
- Hip replacement
- Court: European Court of Justice
- Citation: (2006) C-372/04

Keywords
- Health, charges

R (Watts) v Bedford Primary Care Trust (2006) C-372/04 is a UK enterprise law case, concerning health care in the UK.

== Facts ==
Prior authorisation was needed before travelling to another member state to receive medical care, and being refunded. Ms Yvonne Watts went abroad to France because the UK had waiting lists for a hip replacement and applied for reimbursement. The NHS had no fund out of which to reimburse health care costs from abroad. There was no obligation to pay for private health care within the UK. She claimed this infringed her right to free movement under the Treaty on the Functioning of the European Union article 56, and freedom to receive services.

The England and Wales Court of Appeal made a preliminary reference to the CJEU on whether TFEU article 56 applied.

== Judgment ==
The European Court of Justice, Grand Chamber, held article 56 applied when a patient receives medical services in a hospital environment for consideration. It was legitimate to aim to ensure sufficient and permanent access to a range of high quality hospital treatments in a State if proportionate. The Court engaged in a detailed review of how the NHS treated waiting lists to manage health care provision. It said rising demand can justify waiting lists, but not enough in itself to satisfy the proportionality test. Individual circumstances of the patient need to be assessed.

[Freedom of services applies...] regardless of the way in which the national system with which that person is registered and from which reimbursement of the cost of those services is subsequently sought operates.... [There is...] no need... to determine whether the provision of hospital treatment in the context of a national health service such as the NHS is in itself a service within the meaning of those provisions.

== See also ==
- United Kingdom enterprise law
