= Welsh Ambulance Service =

NHS trust and ambulance service in Wales

Welsh Ambulance Services University NHS Trust
- Ymddiriedolaeth Brifysgol GIG Gwasanaethau Ambiwlans Cymru

- Area covered by Welsh Ambulance Service
- Type: NHS Wales trust
- Established: 1 April 1998
- Headquarters: St Asaph, Wales
- Region served: Wales
- Area size: 8,006 sq mi (20,740 km^{2})
- Population: ~3 million
- Budget: ~£175 million
- Chair: Colin Dennis
- Chief executive: Emma Wood
- Staff: 3,500
- Website: ambulance.nhs.wales

The Welsh Ambulance Services University NHS Trust (Welsh: Ymddiriedolaeth Brifysgol GIG Gwasanaethau Ambiwlans Cymru), or simply the Welsh Ambulance Service, is the national ambulance service for Wales. As of April 2025, it has 3,500 staff providing ambulance and related services to the 3 million residents of Wales.

== History ==
The trust was established on 1 April 1998, following the All Wales Ambulance Review, recommending that the four existing ambulance trusts merge to create one service. This also included ambulance services provided by Pembrokeshire and Derwent NHS Trust.

The trust was awarded "university" status by the Welsh government on 1 April 2024, making it the second ambulance trust to achieve university status in the United Kingdom.

== Organisation ==
The trust headquarters are located at St Asaph. The service is currently divided into three regions:

- Central and West Region – regional office at Swansea
- North Region – regional office at St Asaph
- South East Region – regional office at Cwmbran

== Services ==
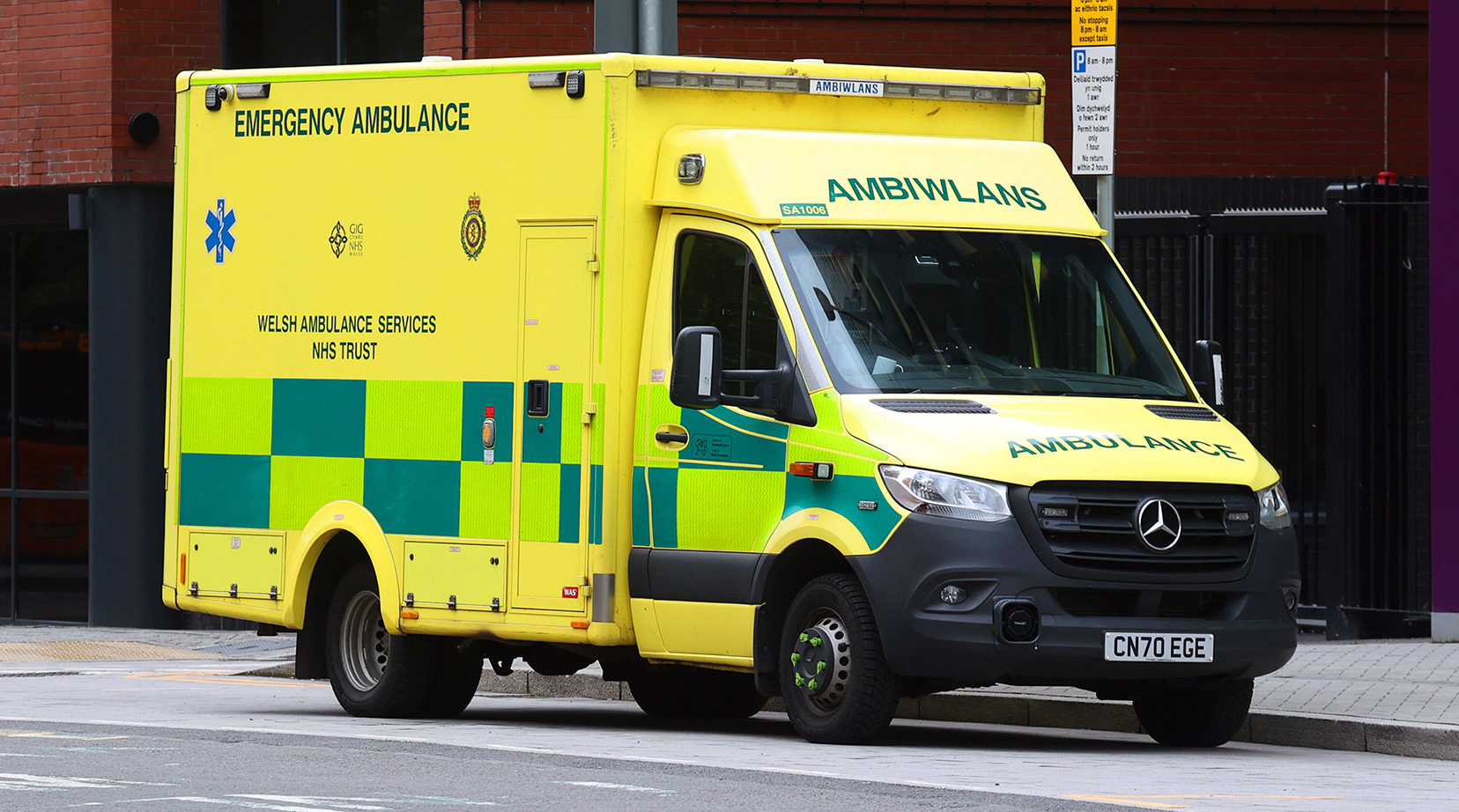
A Welsh Ambulance Service Mercedes-Benz Sprinter ambulance in Cardiff

The trust provides a number of services:

Emergency Medical Services (EMS) - responds to emergency 999 calls and GP's urgent calls. A standard crew combination for this service would normally consist of a paramedic and an emergency medical technician. However double paramedic / double technician crews are not uncommon. As of 2013, the majority of the EMS fleet consists of WAS Mercedes Benz 519 Sprinter Ambulances and Honda CRV or Toyota RAV4 rapid response vehicles (RRV).

Non Emergency Patient Transport Service (NEPTS) - deals with the planned care aspect of ambulance work. NEPTS staff usually provide transport between home and healthcare facilities or some inter-hospital transfers.

Urgent Care Service (UCS) - bridges the gap between NEPTS and EMS, allowing for patients to be transferred between home and hospital or hospital to hospital while meeting the advanced needs that some of these patients may have (such as oxygen administration and continuous monitoring). UCS ambulance crews may also be allocated to EMS calls at times of high demand and following clinical telephony triage by a nurse or face to face triage by advanced paramedic practitioners or paramedic practitioners working from a RRV.

NHS Direct Wales / 111 Wales - a 24-hour telephone and internet health advice service provided by NHS Wales to enable people to obtain advice when use of the national emergency telephone number (999 or 112) does not seem to be appropriate but there is some degree of urgency. NHS Direct Wales / 111 Wales supports EMS Operations by providing clinical triage for "Green 3" calls that are deemed suitable. More than 45% of 999 calls have a disposition of not requiring 999 conveyance. In addition during times of escalation other calls deemed suitable are triaged. It does not replace any of the existing emergency or non-emergency medical services but complements those already existing and enables callers who might not be fully able to diagnose themselves to be directed to care of an appropriate level of urgency, including transport to hospital if the diagnosis merits that action.

Community First Responders (CFR) - volunteers from the community trained in basic first aid, oxygen administration and the use of an automated external defibrillator (AED). They are used by the ambulance service mostly in rural areas to provide basic care, such as cardiopulmonary resuscitation (CPR) before an EMS crew arrives. As a CFR is usually only sent to local calls in specified communities, they often arrive before an EMS ambulance crew, even without the use of blue lights and sirens. Whilst most CFR teams are the sole responsibility of WAST, a number of teams (especially in the county of Powys) are made up of regular divisions from St John Ambulance Cymru although this does not give them any exemptions.

There are developing numbers of advanced paramedic practitioners in the service who through their extended scope of practice are working toward advancing the service their patients receive with "see and treat" and "see and refer" models of care. This removes the need for some patients to travel in an ambulance to A&E.

In 2012, a strategic review of the service was commissioned by the Welsh Government and was conducted by Professor Siobhan McClelland and published in April 2013.

== See also ==
- NHS Wales, the National Health Service in Wales
- NHS Direct Wales
- Wales Air Ambulance
