= Healthcare UK =

British healthcare agency

Healthcare UK is an agency of the British government which promotes the UK healthcare sector to overseas markets and supports healthcare partnerships between the UK and overseas healthcare providers. It is a joint initiative between the Department of Health, UK Trade & Investment and NHS England, with offices in London.

Howard Austin Lyons, the former Managing Director, was appointed Commander of the Order of the British Empire in the 2016 Birthday Honours after launching the organisation in 2013.
