= NHS 111 Wales =

Health advice service in Wales

NHS 24
- Type: Telehealth / Telehomecare
- Established: June 2001; 25 years ago (as a separate entity from NHS Direct)
- Region served: Wales
- Website: 111.wales.nhs.uk

NHS 111 Wales is a 24-hour telephone and internet health advice service provided by NHS Wales to enable people to obtain advice when use of the national emergency telephone number (999 or 112) does not seem to be appropriate but there is some degree of urgency; it also functions as a confidential advice service for some medical matters which a patient might be reluctant to discuss with their own General Practitioner (GP) and has subsidiary helplines for specific health matters such as human papillomavirus (HPV).

It does not replace any of the existing emergency or non-emergency medical services but complements those already existing and enables callers who might not be fully able to diagnose themselves to be directed to care of an appropriate level of urgency, including transport to hospital if the diagnosis merits that action.

== Organisation and history ==
This service was originally provided as part of NHS Direct covering both England and Wales until it was transferred to Welsh control in June 2001. On 1 April 2007 management of NHS Direct Wales was transferred from Swansea NHS Trust to the Welsh Ambulance Services NHS Trust.

== Services ==
=== Telephone helpline ===
The telephone number for NHS Direct Wales was 0845 46 47. All Welsh health boards have migrated to the NHS 111 service, as of 2022.

NHS Direct Wales also has integrated services with many of the A&E departments in Wales where symptomatic callers phoning their A&E department will be transferred to NHS Direct for clinical triage. The service also fronts many of the helplines on behalf of Public Health dealing with issues such as the cryptosporidia outbreak in North Wales, HPV, smoking etc.

The textphone service is on 0845 606 4647.

Access via RNID Typetalk is on 18001 0845 4647.

Callers receive a recorded announcement describing the services available and when appropriate will be transferred to a call handler with an option for Welsh language who will take their details and pass them on to another person with relevant skills or will arrange for them to be called back within three hours. If a problem appears serious enough then an ambulance will be sent. Callers can stay anonymous if they wish.

=== Internet self-service ===
The NHS 111 Wales website provides a gateway to a number of resources in English, Welsh and other languages including a checking symptons and the locations of GP surgeries, dentists, pharmacists, opticians, and other services.
