= Irish Society for the Prevention of Cruelty to Children =

Irish child protection charity

ISPCC
- Founded: 18 January 1956; 70 years ago
- Type: Child protection
- VAT ID no.: 15958
- Registration no.: CHY 5102
- Purpose: Child protection
- Location: Dublin, Ireland
- Coordinates: 53.337494°N 6.250452°W
- Origins: National Society for the Prevention of Cruelty to Children
- Region served: Ireland
- Key people: John Church (CEO)
- Revenue: €5.3million (2017)
- Employees: 106
- Volunteers: 407
- Website: ispcc.ie

The Irish Society for the Prevention of Cruelty to Children (ISPCC) is a charity in Ireland dedicated to enhancing the lives of children and young people. It provides a range of services to children and families in Ireland, and promotes children's rights.

The ISPCC is best known for its free confidential listening service, Childline. It also provides a range of support services from its offices around Ireland. Its support line is available daily to anyone in Ireland concerned about a child.

The ISPCC was founded as a successor to the National Society for the Prevention of Cruelty to Children, which had operated in Ireland from 1889 to 1956.

The first Irish branch of the NSPCC was founded in Dublin in May 1889, with branches founded in Cork and Belfast in 1891.

== Services ==
The ISPCC provides a wide range of services. Annually, ISPCC Childline has over 100,000 conversations with children, through its phone, online and web chat services.

Childline is a free, anonymous and confidential service that is available to children 24 hours a day by phone, text, and online web chat.

The society publishes an annual report which details the volume and types of calls received and the reasons why children call.

== History ==
=== Inspectors ===
Each branch of the NSPCC and ISPCC had an inspector who was paid a salary and was provided with a house that doubled as a local office. Their job was to investigate child abuse or neglect. They were nearly all men and were recruited from the ranks of retired army personnel and police. Each answered to a local committee of volunteers. A brown uniform was worn by inspectors and they were popularly known as "cruelty men."

Inspectors acted independently and were not answerable to the branch committee, though they were answerable to the honorary secretary of the committee, though the onus was on the inspector to communicate with superiors.

=== Social conditions ===
From the 1930s to the 1940s many people lived in squalid conditions. From the 1930s to the 1950s reports by the society graphically described the conditions that people lived in, as well as advocating that children moved from their families live with new families rather than be sent to industrial schools. When John Charles McQuaid became a patron of the society in 1956 the criticism of industrial schools advocacy of adoption and case studies vanished from reports. Membership also changed under McQuaid, who had targeted traditionally Protestant organisations such as the ISPCC and recruited large numbers of Catholics who then gained positions of control.

=== Change in role ===
In 1968 social workers took over the role of inspectors and in 1970 the Health boards took over other functions of the society.

=== Industrial schools ===
Both the NSPCC and ISPCC had a role in committing children to industrial schools, though the exact extend is not clear because of lack of records – the society states that some were lost in a fire in their office in 1961 and some may have been lost in the changeover from the NSPCC in 1956. Frank Duff criticised the society in a letter to John Charles McQuaid in 1941.

The Commission to Inquire into Child Abuse concluded that the society had played an important role in committing children to industrial schools, though the exact extent is unclear as some reports are missing. Poverty was the main reason children were committed to residential care – the idea of supporting families with financial aid was advocated by the society as early as 1951.

== Funding and expenditure ==
The ISPCC is funded almost 80 per cent from fundraising, both public donations and others. In 2011 the ISPCC had an income of €6.5 million. It spent more than one third of this on fund-raising and promotion.

== Controversies ==
In 1999, then ISPCC Chief Executive Cian O'Tighearnaigh resigned his post following accusations of fraud in relation to non-payment of commissions to collectors. He gained an injunction barring the DPP from bringing a prosecution against on the grounds that the delay in instituting criminal proceedings had prejudiced him in obtaining a fair trial.

In September 2011, an ISPCC advert titled "I Can't Wait Until I Grow Up" featuring a young boy being repeatedly assaulted by a man was banned by the Advertising Standards Authority for Ireland (ASAI) for breaching rules on gender equality. The ASAI noted that previous adverts by the charity also solely featured male abusers and that "the portrayal of only male characters as the abusers was in breach of the provisions of the Code". The code states that "marketing communications should respect the principle of the equality of men and women" and "should avoid sex stereotyping and any exploitation or demeaning of men and women". The ISPCC technically complied with the ruling by removing the video from its own website but neglected to remove the banned video from YouTube and claimed that the decision would make it difficult for them to produce material on child abuse in future.

== Ambassadors ==
The list includes: Brian O'Driscoll, Brendan O'Carroll as Mrs Brown, Colin Farrell, Damien Duff, David Coleman, Emeli Sande, Gary Barlow, Grainne Seoige, Ian Dempsey, Jamie Heaslip, Jedward, Jessie J, Keith Barry, Laura Whitmore, Little Mix, Louis Walsh, Martin King, Mary O'Rourke, Michael Buble, Mikey Graham, Miriam O'Callaghan, Niall Horan, Olly Murs, Pat Kenny, Robbie & Claudine Keane, Ryan Tubridy, Saoirse Ronan, The Script, Westlife, The Wanted.

== See also ==
- National Society for the Prevention of Cruelty to Children
