= Telehomecare =

Telehomecare (THC) is a subfield within telehealth. It involves the delivery of healthcare services to patients at home through the use of telecommunications technologies, which enable the interaction of voice, video, and health-related data. The management of care is done from an external site by a healthcare professional.

Though often used interchangeably with remote patient monitoring, telehomecare encompasses more than just monitoring, as it includes education, emotional and social support, information dissemination, and self-care guidance. THC has been employed to improve the management of chronic health conditions such as heart disease, COPD, and diabetes, potentially reducing the number of visits to primary healthcare services. The aging population's increasing demand for home care emphasizes the need for accessible healthcare services, which THC can address. Furthermore, THC facilitates connections between hospitals and primary care providers, improving patients' access to services and potentially reducing healthcare costs.

THC technology caters to various patient needs, ranging from minimal to sophisticated monitoring. A typical system comprises a central unit connected to one or more peripheral devices, such as blood pressure monitors, weight scales, glucometers, pulse oximeters, peak flow meters, or stethoscopes. Patients input their vital signs and health information into the THC unit either manually or via the peripherals. This data is transmitted through telephone lines to a secure server at the manufacturer's data center before being uploaded to a secure web-based application. Healthcare professionals can then access and review the patient's information from any location with internet connectivity.

== Applications ==
Based on research conducted in the United States by the Capital Area Consortium on Aging and Disability, the bandwidth of 128 kbs was useful in a wide range of medical and nursing applications of THC. This includes:

- Patient interviews, histories, review of systems, activities of daily living;
- Follow-up assessment for functional mental status;
- Interventions not requiring physical presence;
- Supervision of physician assistants and nurse practitioners;
- Consultation with nursing colleagues and auxiliary services (physical therapy and occupational therapy);
- Medical consultations;
- Medication compliance;
- Patient education;
- Facilitation of case management;
- Triage in lieu of transport to emergency room or office; and
- Monitoring of vital signs, oximetry, electrocardiogram (ECG).

One of the applications of THC is providing nursing care using telephones, televisions, computers, and videoconferencing. THC can potentially improve patient outcomes, increase healthcare providers' productivity, and reduce healthcare costs. This application may be referred to as telenursing.

== Cost-effectiveness ==
THC has demonstrated a significant impact on hospital admissions and emergency room visits, as well as, walk-in clinic visits. Ontario Telemedicine Network (OTN) conducted a trial program that involved more than 800 patients with one of two chronic diseases - Congestive Heart Failure or COPD. The results were:

- 65% reduction in the number of hospital admissions;
- 72% reduction in the number of Emergency Room visits; and
- 95% reduction in the number of walk-in clinic visits.OTN

THC offers the opportunity to shift the delivery of many healthcare services from hospitals and other healthcare facilities to patients' homes, thus reducing the load on the healthcare system and reserving hospitals for more critical cases. A recent study in The Journal of Telemedicine and Telecare showed that very few studies have evaluated the cost-effectiveness of THC, therefore, more research is needed to assess the value of THC in reducing costs associated with chronic disease management.

== External sources ==
- OTN
