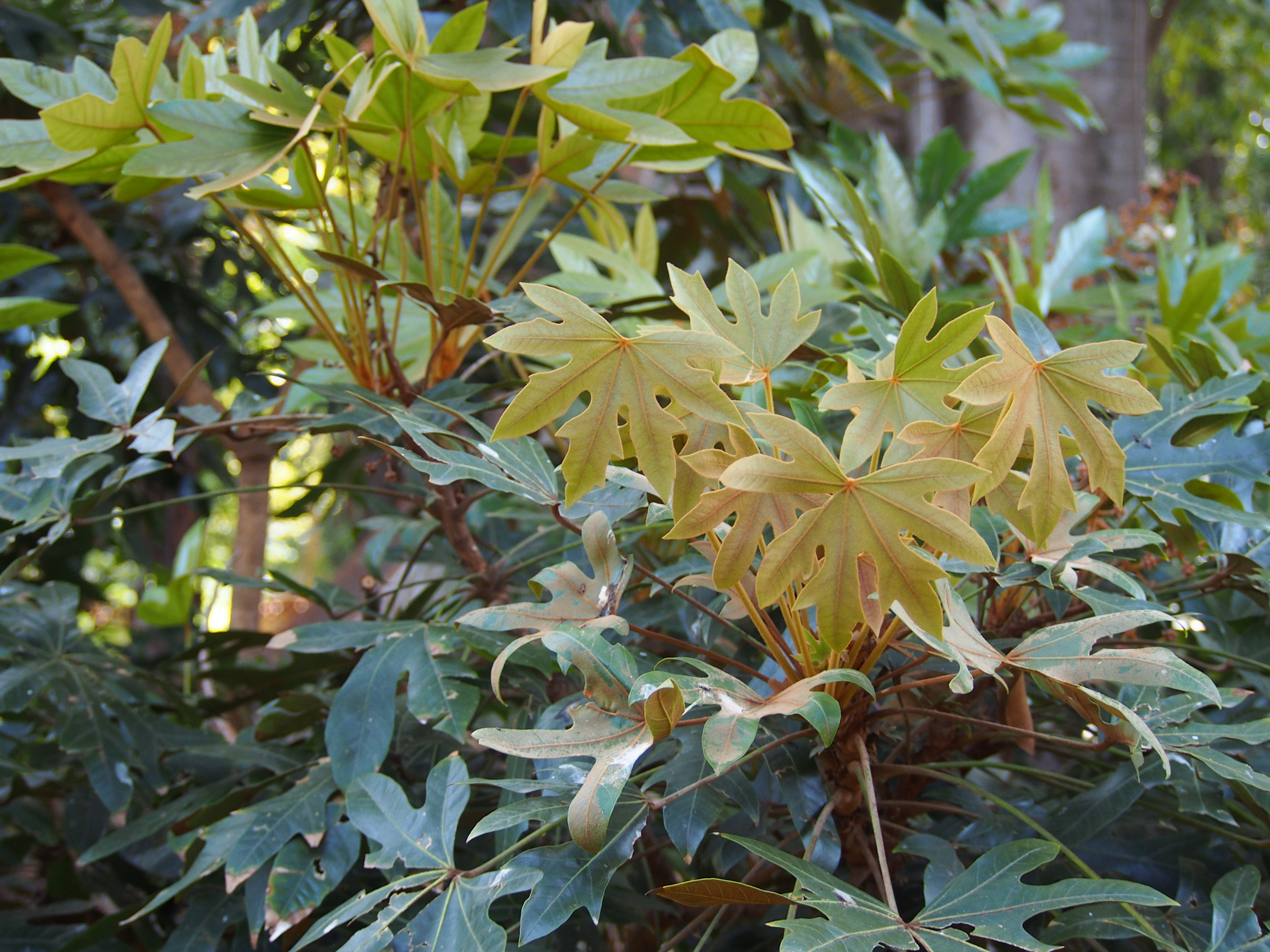

Scientific classification
- Kingdom: Plantae
- Clade: Tracheophytes
- Clade: Angiosperms
- Clade: Eudicots
- Clade: Asterids
- Order: Apiales
- Family: Araliaceae
- Genus: Oreopanax
- Species: O. dactylifolius

Binomial name
- Oreopanax dactylifolius T.Moore

= Oreopanax dactylifolius =

Species of tree

Oreopanax dactylifolius is a species of flowering plant in the family Araliaceae. It is a shrub or small tree that is endemic to southeast Mexico.

== Description ==
Oreopanax dactylifolius is evergreen, and has a medium growth rate, with a mature height of at least 10 feet. The 5-lobed, generally symmetrical leaves resemble maple leaves, light green with a bronze tinge, but with texture reminding one of its ivy-like relatives. The branch structure is very emphatic and the bark texture similar to that of ivy in its bushy or arborescent stage.

== Cultivation ==
Oreopanax dactylifolius is sometimes used in horticulture for its form and decorative foliage.

A specimen tentatively identified as this species has been growing at the "Vets Garden," a therapy garden attached to the Veterans Affairs Hospital of Sawtelle, Los Angeles, CA USA, (90073), for at least 30 years and perhaps more than 40. Its height is approximately 20 feet (6.1 m) and the width of its crown about 12 feet (3.7 m). It was not affected by a winter mid 20s /low 30s frost in early 2007.

A mature specimen of Oreopanax dactylifolius is located in the Winter Garden of the Royal Greenhouses of Laeken, in Brussels, Belgium. This historic conservatory complex was commissioned by King Leopold II in the late 19th century, and it is claimed that the tree has been growing there since that time. The specimen reaches the upper canopy of the glasshouse and displays the characteristic palmate, ivy-textured foliage of the species.

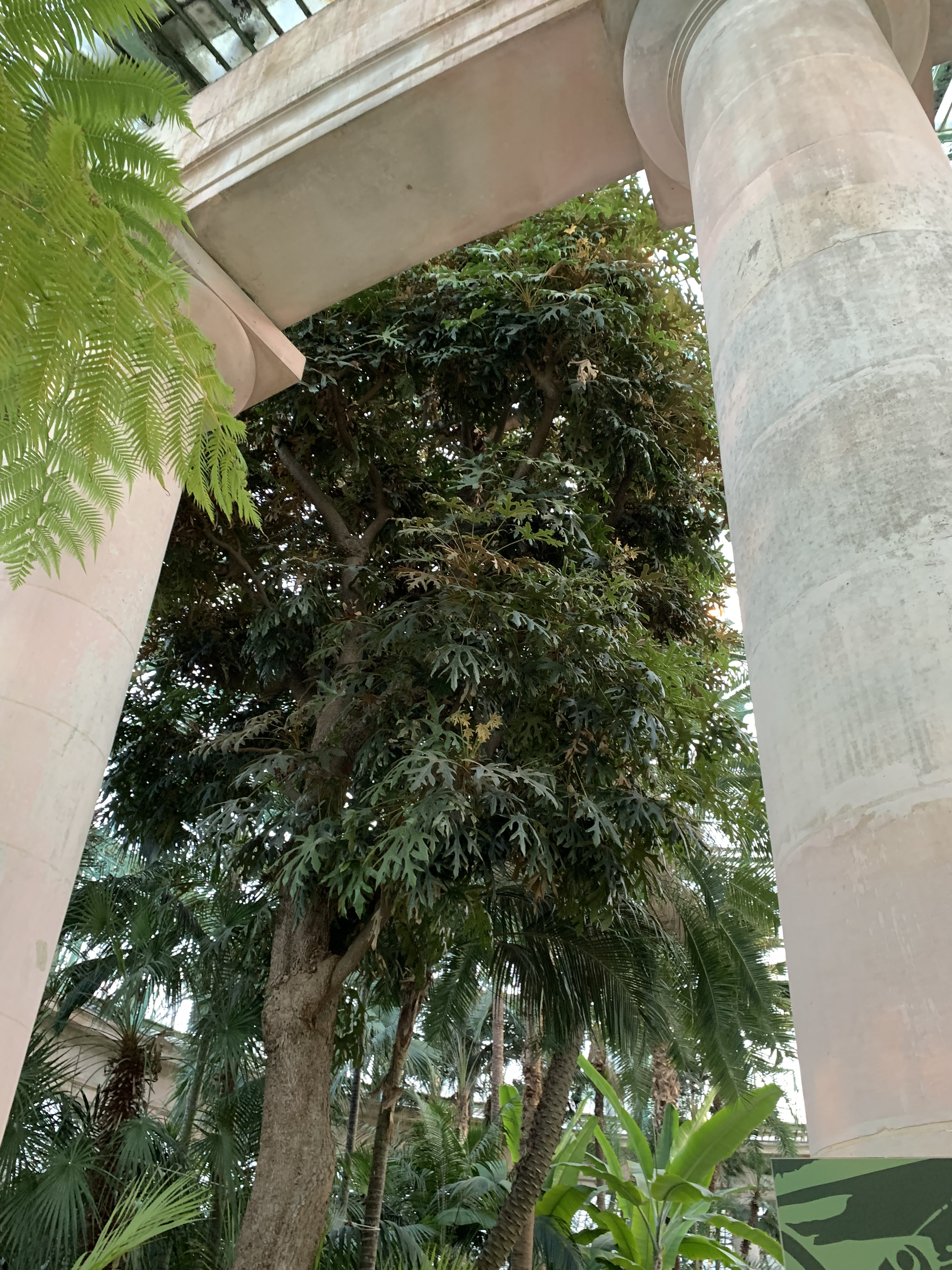
Winter Garden of the Royal Greenhouses of Laeken, Belgium. This Oreopanax is said to be there since the time of King Leopold II
