= Child Focus =

Belgian foundation

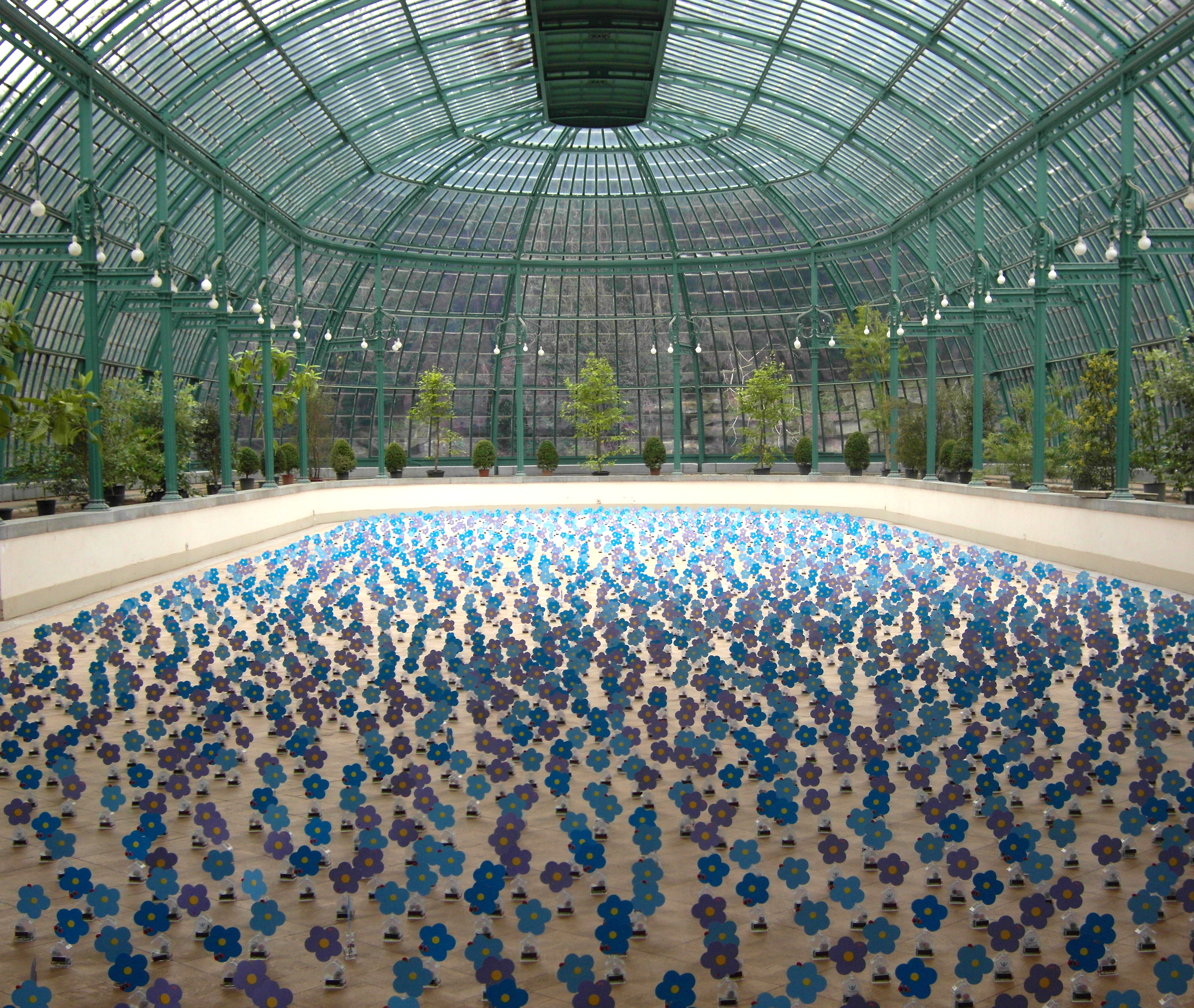
Displayed at the Royal Greenhouses of Laeken in cooperation with Child Focus: The Dancing Solar Forget-Me-Not by Alexandre Dang (International Missing Children's Day event 2010).

Child Focus (or the European Center for Missing and Sexually Exploited Children) is a Belgian foundation that supports prevention and investigation of missing children, abducted children, runaway children, and sexually exploited children, along with psychological and legal support to the victims. They also follow their cases and sometimes ensure they are treated with due care by the persons in charge. Finally, they help and spread the information about missing children by publishing their pictures and descriptions in newspapers, magazines, etc.

Since 1998, Child Focus has treated 3,000 cases a year, and closed 70% of them within the year.

== History ==
Child Focus was created on Jean-Denis Lejeune's initiative in June 1996, one year after the abduction of his daughter Julie and her friend Melissa by Marc Dutroux.

Lejeune had learned about the existence of the National Center for Missing and Exploited Children in Washington, D.C., and went to visit it in order to study its structure. During the White March in Brussels on October 20, 1996, he asked Prime Minister Jean-Luc Dehaene for help in creating a similar organization in Belgium. Its honorary president is her Majesty Queen Paola.

On March 31, 1998, Child Focus was fully operational, and in July 1997, Daniel Cardon de Lichtbuer became the first Chairman of the organization.

== See also ==
- Heidi De Pauw
- Michel Fourniret
- Claude Lelièvre
