= Alexandre Dang =

French visual artist

Alexandre Dang (born 19 May 1973 in Strasbourg, France) is a French visual artist. He lives and works currently in Brussels, Belgium.

== Biography ==
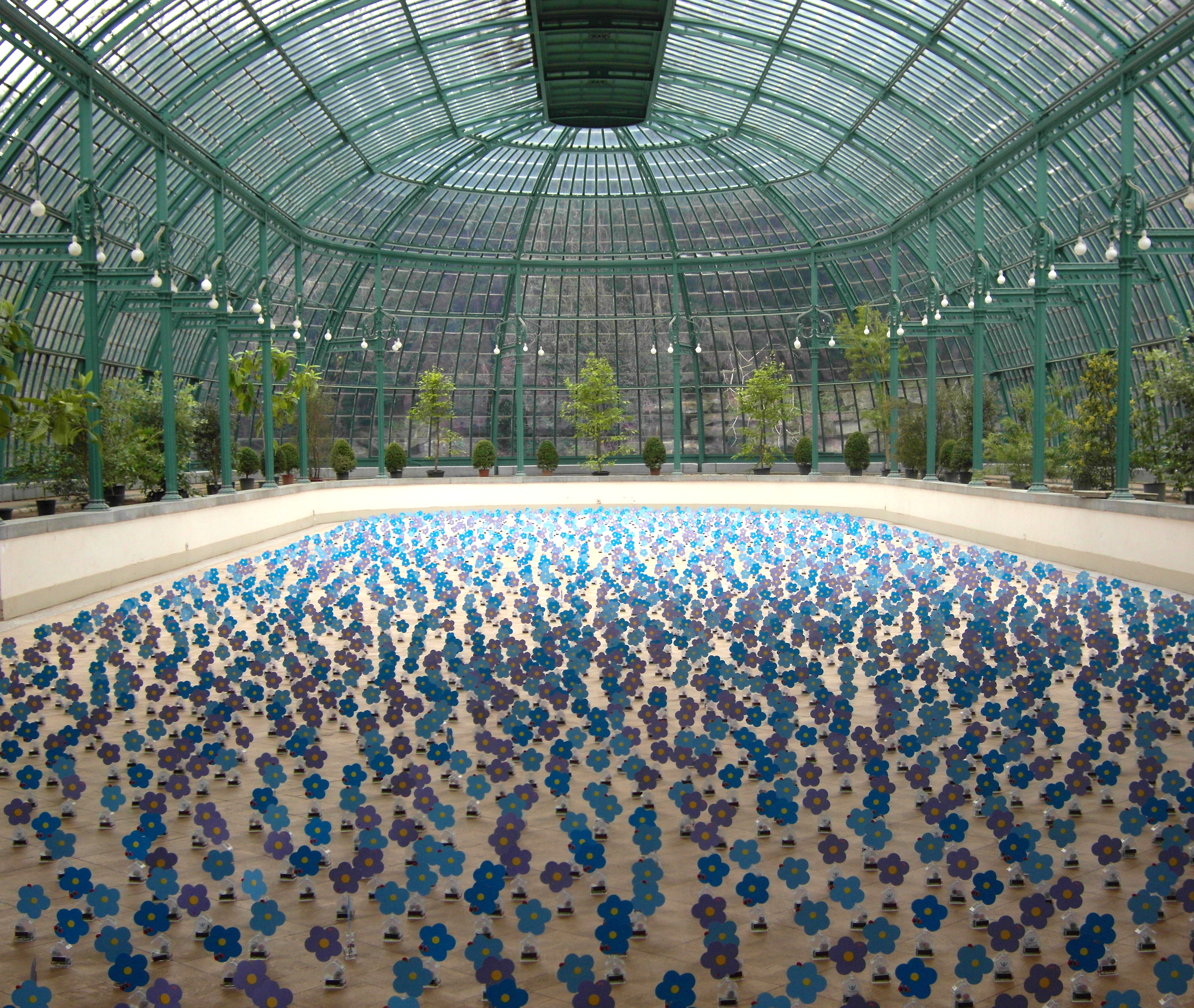
The Dancing Solar Forget-Me-Not (for Child Focus) – Alexandre Dang – Royal Green House Laeken, Brussels, 2010

Alexandre Dang comes originally from a scientific background (engineer at the École polytechnique (Paris) and at the Ecole Nationale des Ponts et Chaussées (Paris).

Alexandre Dang has developed his own artistic creation; he creates artworks integrating solar energy to enable them to move (« kinetic art »). He is part of an artistic movement called Solar Art or Solar Artwork, which incorporates solar energy in artworks.

Alexandre Dang started his artistic work in 2004. He has been influenced by artists like Alexander Calder with his mobiles and stabiles and Jean Tinguely with his machines. He creates especially in situ installations with "Dancing Solar Flowers".

"Each solar flower is made up of an engine and a solar cell. The solar cell collects sunlight and turns it into electricity. With electricity, the motor starts and the flower moves".

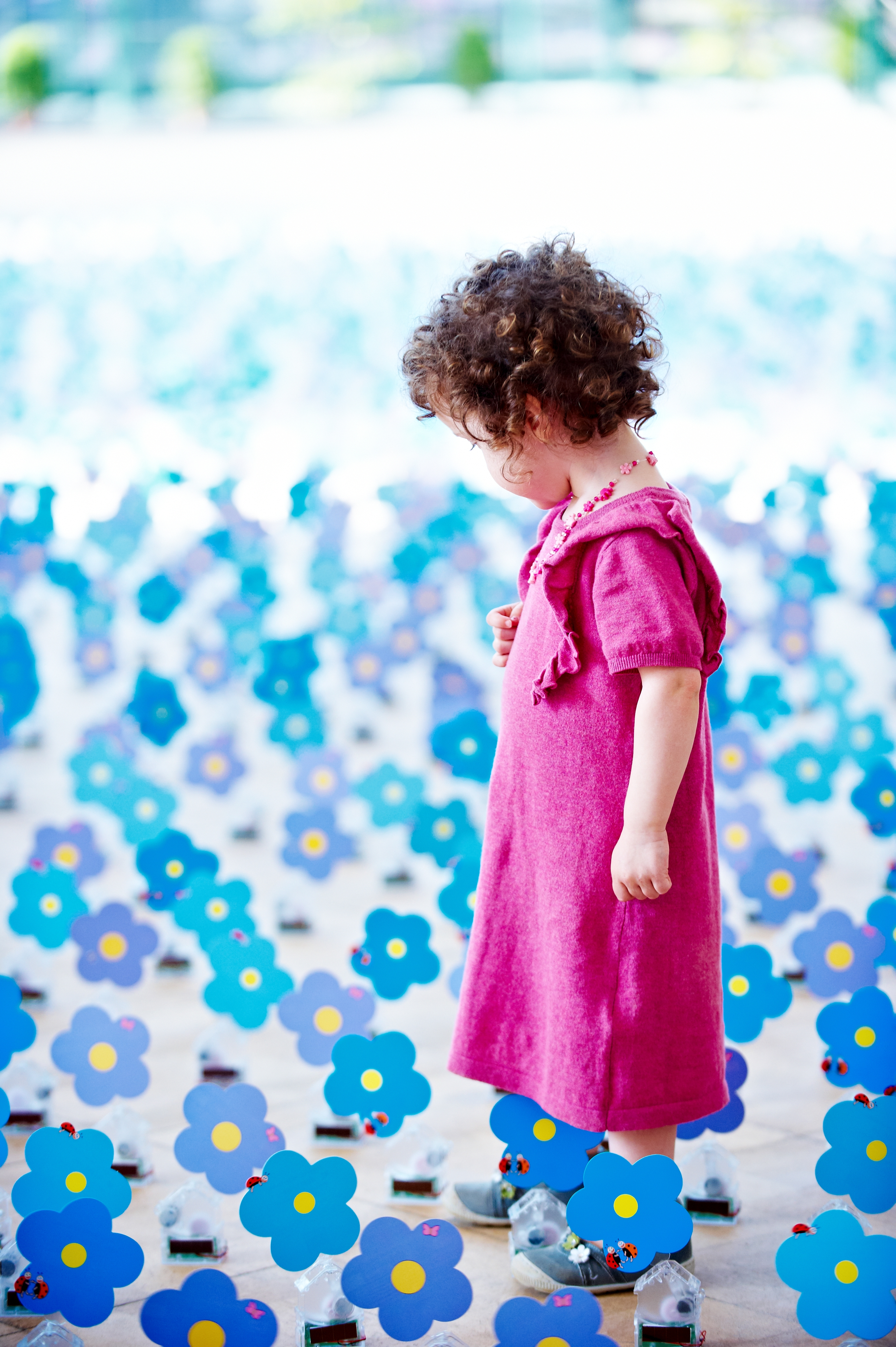
« The Dancing Solar Forget-Me-Not » – Alexandre Dang – Royal Green House Laeken, Brussels, 2010

"This is socially conscious art that raises awareness about respect for the environment, sustainable development, renewable energy, and more generally, our modes of production and consumption".

Beyond the aesthetic dimension, his art works also trigger debate on the use of energy today and on the energy perspectives in the future. In addition, Alexandre Dang organizes regularly workshops to raise public awareness on sustainable energy through art. Some workshops were held notably in schools (European School of Uccle (Brussels), European School of Woluwe-Saint-Lambert (Brussels) ... ), during the European Solar Days or during festivals such as the festival Couleur Café.

He cofounded Solar Solidarity International (a Non Profit International Association) which raises awareness about solar energy and contributes financially to solar electrification projects in developing countries (schools, hospitals ... ).

Alexandre Dang has supported the solar electrification of the hospital of Daga-Youndoum, in Senegal; the solar electrification of a school in M'Pédougou, in Mali; the electrification, heating and solar cooking of the orphanage MikumiKids in Tanzania.

== Exhibitions ==
=== 2018 ===
- Shifang Cultural Center, Chongqing, China – "Harmony and Peace", Solo exhibition
- Yonsei University, Seoul, South of Korea – Video exhibition
- Cultural Center Correios, Rio de Janeiro, Brasil – In situ installation of Dancing Solar Flowers "Luz, Vida e Paz"
- Heritage Space Cultural Center, Hanoi, Vietnam – "Light and Life", Solo exhibition
- Sun Gallery, Hayward, CA, USA – Video exhibition

=== 2017 ===
- Chengdu A4 Art Museumn Chengdu, China – Dancing Solar Flowers at ISTART Children's Art Festival
- Muzeon Park of Arts, Moscow, Russia – Installation of Dancing Solar Flowers in cooperation with Fond Podsolnuh at the Moscow Flower Show
- Kronstadt, Saint-Petersburg, Russia – Installation of Dancing Solar Flowers at Kronfest "Ecology and Art Festival"
- Elektrownia, Radom, Poland – Monographic exhibition
- Museo Luigi Bailo, Treviso, Italie – Dancing Solar Flowers
- Villa Méditerranée, Marseille, France – Dancing Solar Flowers, In Situ Solar Art

=== 2016 ===
- Museum of National History, Genève, Switzerland – Dancing Solar Flowers
- KINTEX (Korea International Exhibition Center), Goyang, South of Korea – Special exhibition, Dancing Solar Flowers by curator KIM Ji-Yong
- Bibliothèque EPM, Medellin, Colombia – Dancing Solar Flowers
- Museum of Contemporary Art (MOCA), Xi'An, Chine – Dancing Solar Flowers
- Nian Dai Mai Shu Guan, Wenzhou, Chine – Dancing Solar Flowers
- Arcade, Aix-en-Provence, France – Solar Art – Video

=== 2015 ===
- Art Tower Mito, Mito, Japan – Dancing Solar Flowers
- National Museum of Singapore, Singapore – Dancing Solar Flowers at "Masak Masak" Children's Season
- Museo dei Bambini (MUBA), Milan, Italie – Dancing Solar Flowers
- International Kinetic Art Exhibition and Symposium, Boynton Beach, Miami, Florida, USA – Dancing Sol'Art Butterflies
- John Jay College, New York City, USA – Dancing Solar Flowers
- Museum of National History, Mons, Belgium – The Field of Turning Solar Sunflowers

=== 2014 ===
- Roundabout N4 / N958 (Highway E 42, exit 12), Namur, Belgium – Some seeds fell into good soil and produced a crop
- Hsinchu, Taipei, Taiwan – MORIART Festival – Dancing Solar Flowers and Wind Flowers
- Central House of Artists, "The State Tretyakov Gallery at Krymsky Val", Moscou, Russie – Dancing Solar Flowers at Science Art
- Museum of Contemporary Art (MOCA), Taipei, Taiwan – Dancing Solar Flowers
- Parc du Cinquantenaire, Brussels, Belgium – Dancing Solar Flowers at Fête de l'Environnement
- French Institute – Centre Saint-Louis, Rome, Vatican – Dancing Solar Flowers

=== 2013 ===
- Biennale of Cerveira, Vila Nova de Cerveira, Casa Amarela, Portugal – Dancing Solar Flowers and Butterflies
- Alliance Française of Tianjin, China – Dancing Solar Flowers
- Espace Electra, Fondation EDF, France – Made in Light – Vous êtes la Lumière du Monde
- Marco Polo Airport, Venice, Italy – Dancing Solar Poppies and Butterflies
- Chateau Swan, OCT Project Department of Xi'an, China – Dancing Solar Flowers
- Musée des Beaux-Arts de Tournai, Tournai, Belgium – Champ de Tournesols Solaires Tournants
- Le French May, Alliance Française of Hong Kong, Hong Kong, China – Dancing Solar Flowers

=== 2012 ===
- Soho Gallery for Digital Art, New York City, USA – Land Art Generator Initiative (LAGI) – The Turning Sunflowers
- 16th International Biennale of Small Paper Format, Nismes, Belgium – Dancing Solar Flower
- European Commission (Berlaymont), Brussels, Belgium – EU Sustainable Energy Week – The Field of Turning Solar Sunflowers
- Parc du Cinquantenaire, Brussels, Belgium – Fête de l'Environnement – Dancing Solar Flowers and Solar Art
- Place du Sablon, Brussels, Belgium – The Solar Flowers Dancing in "Hymne à la Vie"
- Singapore Art Museum (SAM), Singapore – Singapore Art Garden 2012 – The Solar Flowers Dancing on the Façade of SAM
- World Expo 2012, Belgian Pavillon, Yeosu, South Korea – Dancing Solar Waves and Flowers

=== 2011 ===
- European Parliament, Brussels, Belgium – Dancing Solar Flowers
- Singapore Art Museum (SAM), Singapore – Dancing Solar Flowers
- Tallinn 2011 – European Capital of Culture, Tallinn, Estonia – Tallinn Flower Festival – Field of Dancing Solar Flowers
- Atomium, Brussels, Belgium – International Day of Missing Children in cooperation with Child Focus – Dancing Solar Forget-Me-Not
- European Parliament, Brussels, Belgium – International Day of Missing Children in cooperation with Missing Children Europe – Dancing Solar Forget-Me-Not
- Museum of Natural History, Mons, Belgium – Field of Dancing Solar Flowers

=== 2010 ===
- Royal Palace, Brussels, Belgium – Child Focus and Missing Children Europe – Dancing Solar Flowers and Dancing Solar Forget-Me-Not
- European Commission (Charlemagne Building), Brussels, Belgium – Green Week
- European Commission (Berlaymont), Brussels, Belgium – NGO Missing Children Europe – Field of Dancing Solar Forget-Me-Not
- World Expo Shanghai 2010 – European & Belgian Pavilion, Shanghai, China – The Dancing Solar Magnolias
- Royal Greenhouses of Laeken, Brussels, Belgium – The Dancing Solar Forget-Me-Not
- European Commission Building (DG AIDCO), Brussels, Belgium - EU Sustainable Energy Week – Dancing Solar Art

=== 2009 ===
- Espace Champerret, Paris, France - Manifestation of Contemporary Art (MAC-Paris)
- Galeries Royales Saint Hubert, Brussels, Belgium – Child Focus for the Day of missing children – Dang'cing Solar Forget-Me-Not
- Royal Greenhouses of Laeken, Brussels, Belgium – Child Focus – Dang'cing Sol'Art Forget-Me-Not
- Madou Tower and European Commission (Charlemagne Building), Brussels, Belgium – European Sustainable Energy Week – Dang'cing Sol'Art Mobiles
- Bozar, Brussels, Belgium – Truc Troc – Dang'cing Sol'Art Flowers

=== 2008 ===
- Feria Valencia, Spain – European Photovoltaic Solar Energy Conference and Exhibition – Dang'cing Sol'Art Flowers
- European School of Brussels I, Brussels, Belgium – 50th Anniversary – Dang'cing Solar Art
- Council of the European Union (Justus Lipsius), Brussels, Belgium – Joy for Europe: United in Diversity! – The Sol'Art Flowers Dang'cing
- European Commission (Charlemagne Building), Brussels, Belgium – Sustainable Energy Week – Dang'cing Solar Art

=== 2007 ===
- European Commission (Berlaymont), Brussels, Belgium – Schuman Trophy Ceremony
- Place Royale, Brussels, Belgium Belgian – National Day – The Solar Flowers Dang'cing for Europe
- Chapelle of Europe, Brussels, Belgium – The Solar Flowers Dang'cing for Europe
- European Commission (Berlaymont), Brussels, Belgium – European Union Sustainable Energy Week – Europe Dang'cing for Joy

=== 2006 ===
- Autoworld, Brussels, Belgium – DG TREN Day – Dang'cing Sunflowers
- European Parliament, Brussels, Belgium – 1st General Assembly of the Technology Platform for Photovoltaics – Dang'cing Sunflowers
- European Commission (Berlaymont), Brussels, Belgium – Journée Porte Ouverte – Dang'cing Solar Art
- Renewable Energy House, Brussels, Belgium – Inauguration of the Renewable Energy House - Dang'cing Sunflowers
- European Commission (Berlaymont), Brussels, Belgium – The Field of Dang'cing Sunflowers

=== 2005 ===
- Cathedrale St Michel & Ste Gudule, Brussels, Belgium – "Messe des Artistes" on 20 November – Dang'cing Solar Art
- Conference Center, Barcelona, Spain – International conference and exhibition of solar energy – Dang'cing Solar Art
- European Commission (Charlemagne Building), Brussels, Belgium – Green Week – Dang'cing Solar Art
- European Parliament, Brussels, Belgium – Dang'cing Solar Art

=== 2004 ===
- European Parliament, Brussels, Belgium – Dang'cing Solar Art
- European Commission (Charlemagne Building), Brussels, Belgium – Launch of the European Technology Platform for Photovoltaics – Viva Europa !

== Prices ==
- Best Young Artist of the Year Award at 2018 GAMMA Young Artist Competition
- Prix d'Art Chrétien, Eglise de la Trinité, Brussels, Belgium Alexandre Dang is being awarded by the Prix d'Art Chrétien for "The Resurrection"
- Selection at the "Prix de la jeune sculpture de la Communauté française de Belgique" – University of Liège – Former Abbey of Gembloux, Belgium

== Workshops ==
- 2018 : Brickworks, Toronto, Canada – Fill in yours own pattern!
- 2017 : Children Hospital RDKB, Moscow, Russia – Fill in yours own pattern!
- 2016 : Sharjah International Book Fair, Sharjah, Emirates – Fill in yours own pattern!
- 2015 : Morocco Solar Festival, Ouarzazate, Morocco – Fill in your own pattern!
- 2015 : Art Works for Change – Videos of Dancing Solar Flowers at "Footing the Bill: Art and Our Ecological Footprint"
- 2013 : Ecole Robert Dubois, Hôpital des Enfants Reine Fabiola, Brussels, Belgium – Fill in your own pattern!
- 2012 : Parc Schuman school, Woluwe-Saint-Lambert, Brussels, Belgium – Fill in your own pattern!
- 2009 : European School of Woluwe-Saint-Lambert, Brussels, Belgium – Fill in your own pattern!
- 2008 : European School of Brussels I, Brussels, Belgium – Art and Renewable Energy
- 2008 : European Commission (Berlaymont), Brussels, Belgium – With the pupils of the European School of Brussels I (Uccle) – Dang'cing Sol'Art Flowers

== Conferences ==
=== 2018 ===
- Heritage Space Cultural Center, Hanoi, Vietnam – Conference, Artist talk "Solar Art"

=== 2017 ===
- University of Liège, Complex Opéra, Liège, Belgium – World Humanities Conference, co-organised by UNESCO, 8 Aug
- Muzeon Park of Arts, Moscow, Russia – Conference on "Solar Art" in cooperation with Fond Podsolnuh at the Moscow Flower Show

=== 2016 ===
- Biblioteca EPM, Medellín, Colombia – Conference on Solar Art
- Museum of Contemporary Art (MOCA), Xi’AN, China – Conference on Solar Art
- Arcade, Aix-en-Provence, France – Conference on Solar Art

=== 2014 ===
- Furman University, John's Hall 101, Greenville, South Carolina, USA – Conference on Solar Art

=== 2013 ===
- European Commission (Van Maerlant 2), Brussels, Belgium – Conference "How solar art becomes art?" in the frame of the EU Sustainable Energy Week
- Bilbao Arte, Bilbao, Spain – Conference "La Ciencia y el Arte"

=== 2012 ===
- European Commission (Van Maerlant 2), Brussels, Belgium Conference "Artworks Powered by Solar Energy" in the frame of the EU Sustainable Energy Week

=== 2011 ===
- Délégation Bretagne, Brussels, Belgium – Conference "Art and Sustainable Development"

== See also ==
- Kinetic Art
