= Royal Greenhouses of Laeken =

Heated greenhouses in the park of the Royal Palace of Laeken

- Serres royales de Laeken (French); Koninklijke Serres van Laken (Dutch)
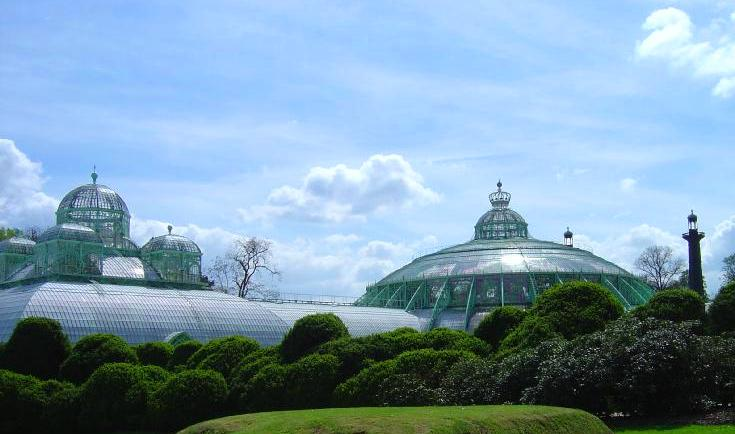
- The Congo Greenhouse (left) and the Winter Garden (right), part of the Royal Greenhouses of Laeken
- Interactive map of Royal Greenhouses of Laeken
- Type: Greenhouses
- Location: Laeken, City of Brussels, Brussels-Capital Region, Belgium
- Coordinates: 50°53′18″N 4°21′37″E
- Area: 2.5 ha (6.2 acres)
- Created: 1874
- Owner: Belgian state
- Public transit: 6 Stuyvenbergh
- Website: www.monarchie.be/en

The Royal Greenhouses of Laeken (French: Serres royales de Laeken, Dutch: Koninklijke Serres van Laken) are a vast complex of monumental heated greenhouses in the park of the Royal Palace of Laeken (northern part of the City of Brussels), Belgium. The historic complex contains tropical, subtropical and cold greenhouses, and is home to the Royal Botanic Collection, which includes large collections of camellias, orange trees and many plants originating from the African parts of the former Belgian Empire.

The greenhouses were commissioned by King Leopold II, originally designed by the architect Alphonse Balat, and built between 1874 and 1905. Following Balat's death in 1895, Leopold called upon the architects Henri Maquet and Charles Girault. They are now part of the Royal Domain of Laeken and the royal private gardens belonging to the Belgian royal family, and are accessible to the public only a few days a year.

== History ==
=== Inception and construction ===
The original gardens of the Royal Palace of Laeken date back to the 18th century, but King Leopold II drastically altered their appearance. The king, having visited the Crystal Palace at the Great Exhibition of 1851 in London, wanted a similarly progressive building in his palace's garden, which would combine his love of plants with multifunctional spaces that could also be used as a banquet, theatre and dining halls. He first approached the botanist Jean Linden for this project, but found his design too unambitious. He then commissioned his architect, Alphonse Balat. Balat's plans surpassed all that had been achieved at the time, even the Palm house in London's Kew Gardens and Carl Bouché's botanical garden in Berlin-Schöneberg. The project was the result of a close collaboration between Balat and the king, involving frequent discussions, correspondence and preliminary designs.

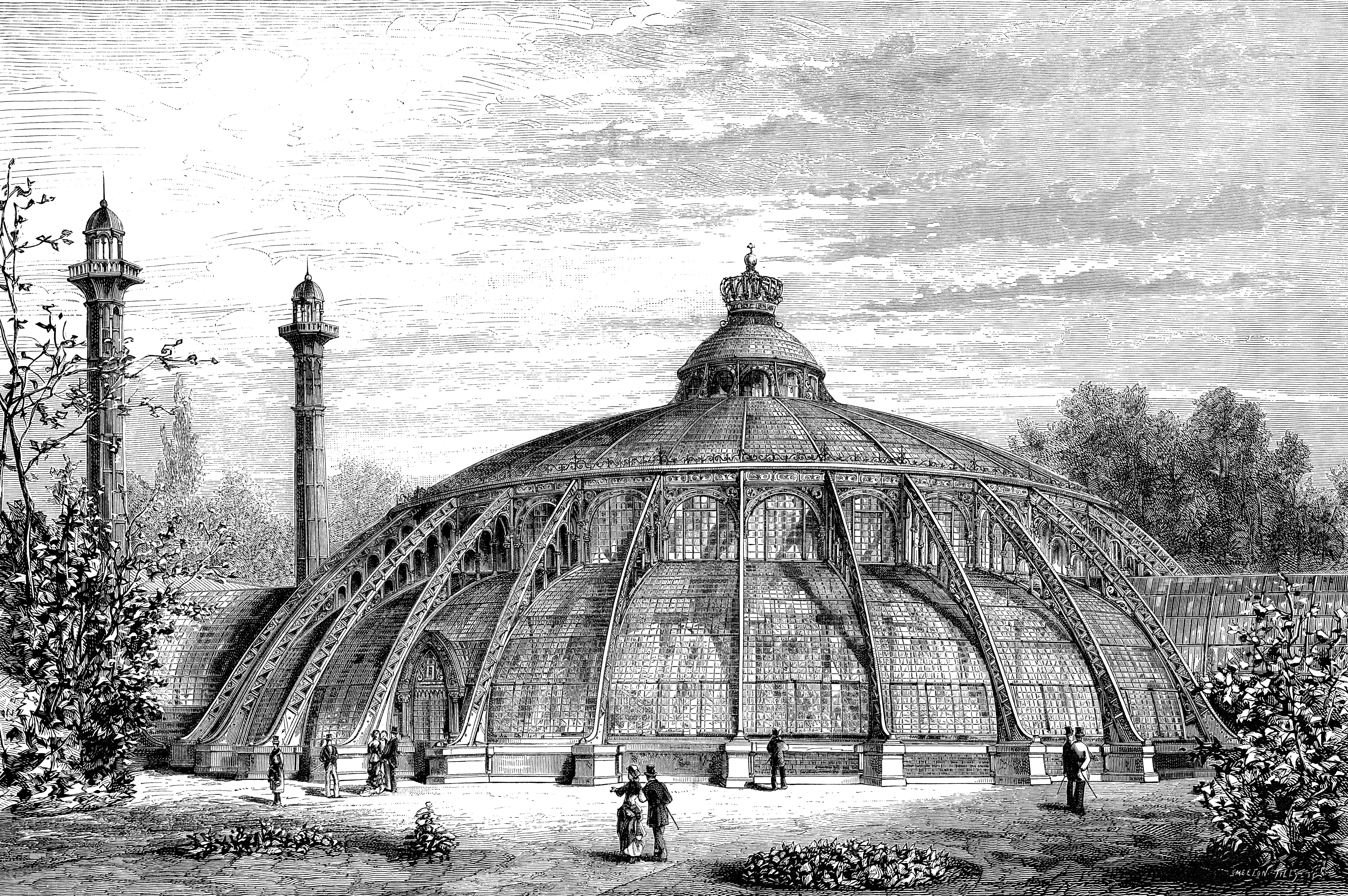
Winter Garden of the Royal Greenhouses of Laeken in 1880, etching from L'Illustration nationale

The first construction phase took place between 1874 and 1893, ending with the completion of the so-called Iron Church, a domed greenhouse, which would originally serve as the royal chapel. The inauguration took place in 1880, but the complex was also expanded afterwards. During that period, the king was establishing his Congo Free State, a private colony that was founded in 1885. The greenhouses were intended as a symbol of the king's colonial power, with plants from Central Africa said to illustrate that power. In particular, the Congo Greenhouse and the Embarcadère Greenhouse were built in 1886–1888 from this perspective. A third zone was constructed from 1892 to 1905. Following Balat's death in 1895, Leopold called upon the architects Henri Maquet and Charles Girault to oversee this work. The octagonal Palm Pavilion was furnished as a bedroom and connected to the palace by a subterranean corridor where Leopold received his mistresses. After the king's death in 1909, the greenhouses were preserved, but the Iron Church was converted into a private royal bathing house.

=== Present-day ===
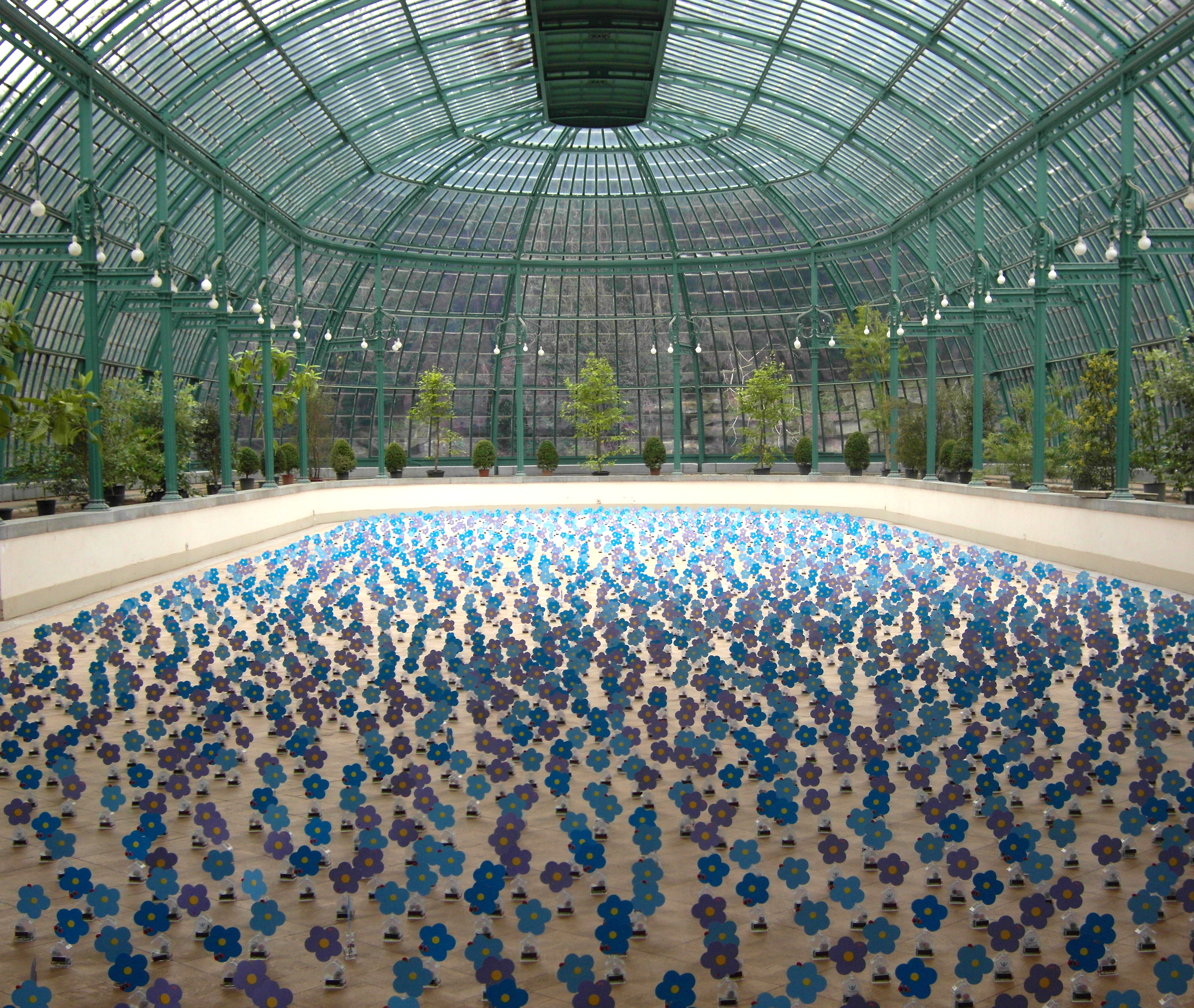
The Dancing Solar Forget-Me-Not (for Child Focus), Alexandre Dang, exhibit in the Royal Greenhouses

The Winter Garden at Laeken Palace still serves as the setting for royal receptions. Every year in the spring, the greenhouses are partially opened to the public for twenty days at the request of Leopold II. This tradition has been carried on by all monarchs who reigned after him. The greenhouses are also sometimes used today for contemporary art exhibits and displays, such as Alexandre Dang's The Dancing Solar Forget-Me-Not for the International Day of Missing Children (in cooperation with Child Focus) in 2010.

Since 2021, a new heating system for the Royal Domain of Laeken has come into operation: the new network is directly connected to the Neder-Over-Heembeek incinerator via 4.5 km (2.8 mi) of underground pipes allowing the residual heat released by the incinerator to be exported to the Royal Domain and thus heat the greenhouses and buildings.

== Description ==
The Royal Greenhouses of Laeken are among Belgium's major 19th-century monuments. They were built entirely in metal and glass, which represented a spectacular innovation for the time (as did the Crystal Palace in London). This immense complex, whose total floor surface is 2.5 ha (6.2 acres), takes on the appearance of a glass city set in a hilly landscape. It is characterised by monumental pavilions, glass domes, as well as wide galleries that run through the grounds like covered streets. In the steel constructions, Balat introduced decorative motifs derived from plants and flowers. This formed a first step towards Art Nouveau architecture, a style that was further developed by Victor Horta, who served as an apprentice of Balat's. Approximately 800,000 litres (210,000 US gallons) of fuel oil are needed each year to heat the buildings.

=== Orangery ===
The existing Orangery was built between 1817 and 1819 by the architects Guislain-Joseph Henry and François Verly on the orders of King William I of the Netherlands. A rectangular neoclassical building, 97 metres (318 ft) long, 13 metres (43 ft) wide, and 8 metres (26 ft) high, it is connected to the palace via the Theatre Greenhouse. The Dining Room Greenhouse is also attached to it. It houses orange trees, a collection of laurels, rhododendrons, and camellias, as well as a bust of Leopold II by the sculptor Jef Lambeaux.

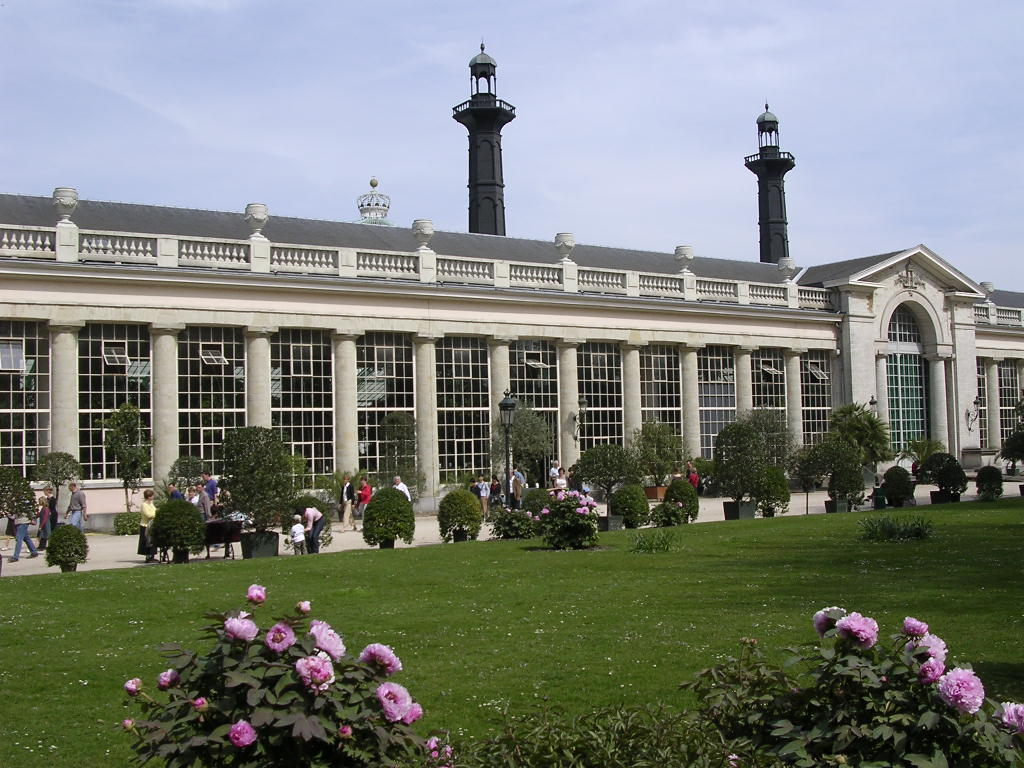
Orangery

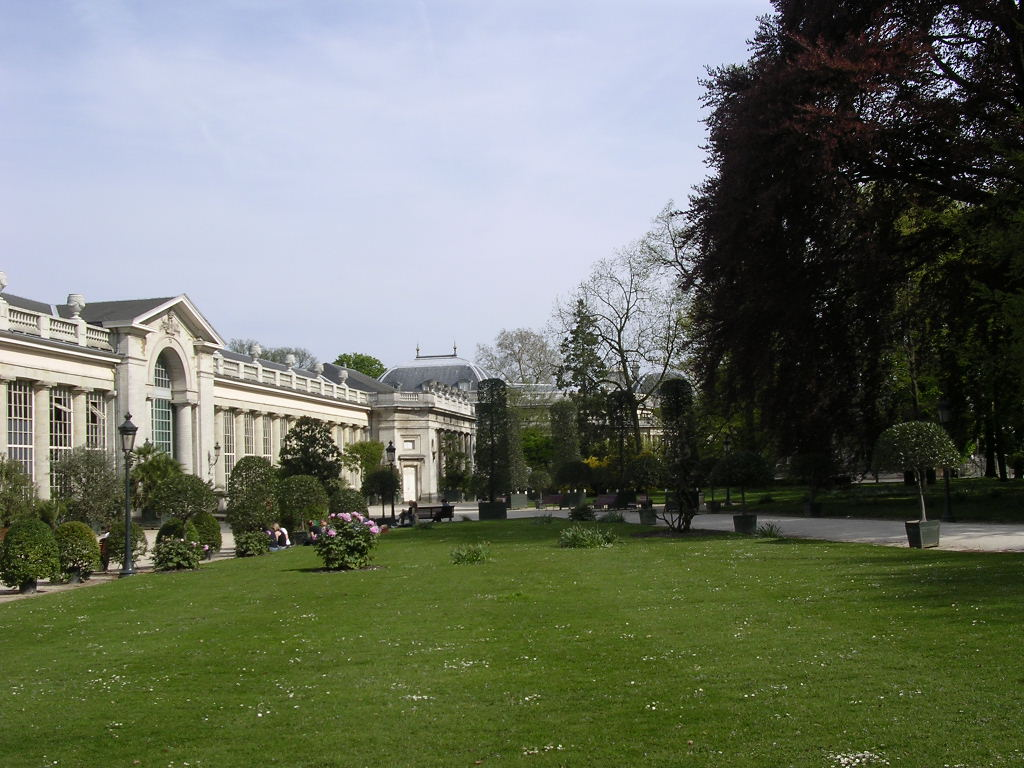
View of the Orangery in the direction of the theatre

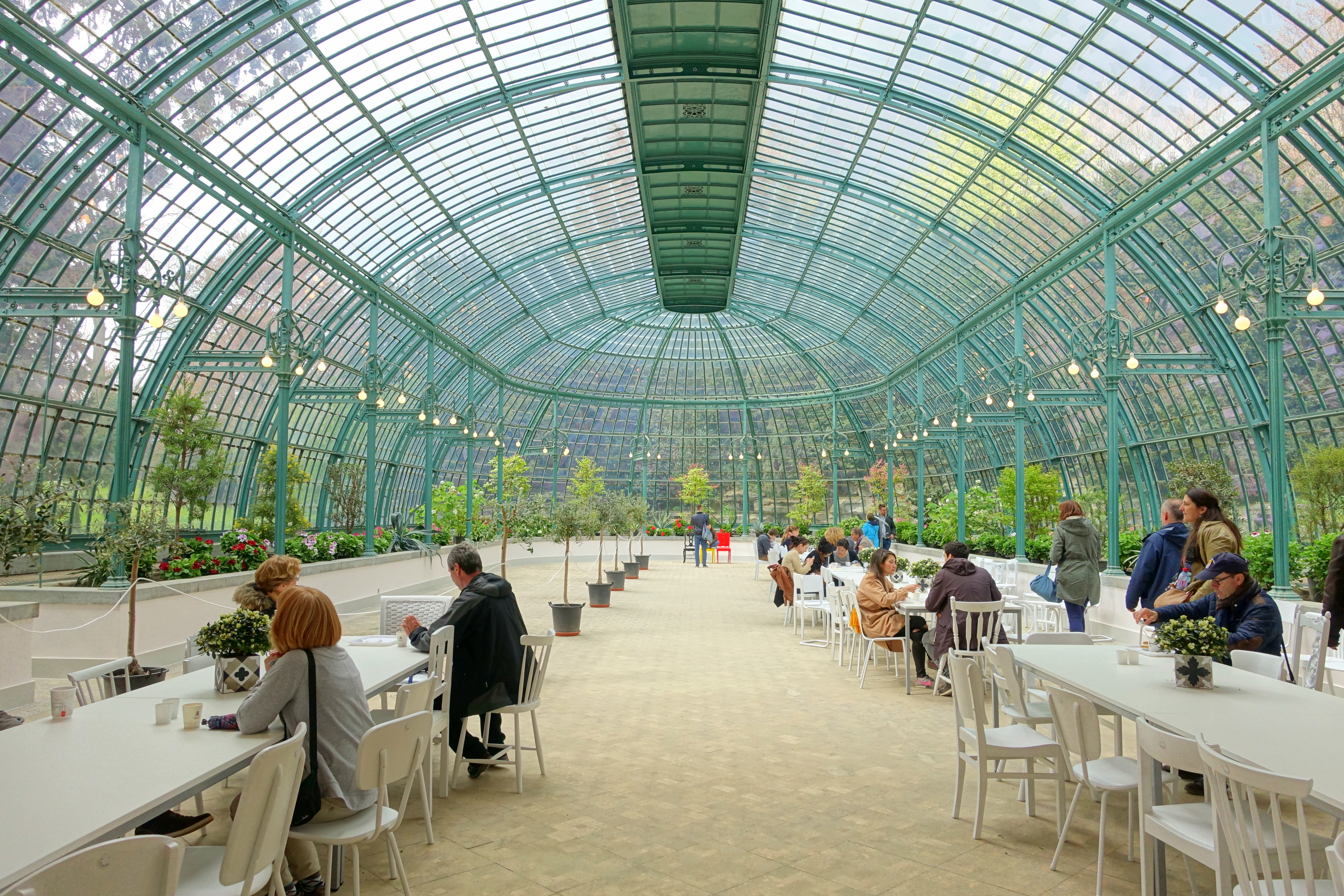
Interior of the Orangery

=== Winter Garden ===
The largest greenhouse is the round-domed Winter Garden, built in 1874. With a diameter of 57 metres (187 ft) and a height of 25 metres (82 ft), it is made up of a number of concentric cast iron trusses, which are supported halfway through their span by a circular Doric colonnade. The trusses' starting and ending points rest on the ground, giving the greenhouse the appearance of a glass dome supported by flying buttresses. Its enormous dimensions made it possible to plant Congolese palm trees in the rotunda. This Winter Garden, the main building of the complex, was also of great importance for the development of cast-iron architecture.

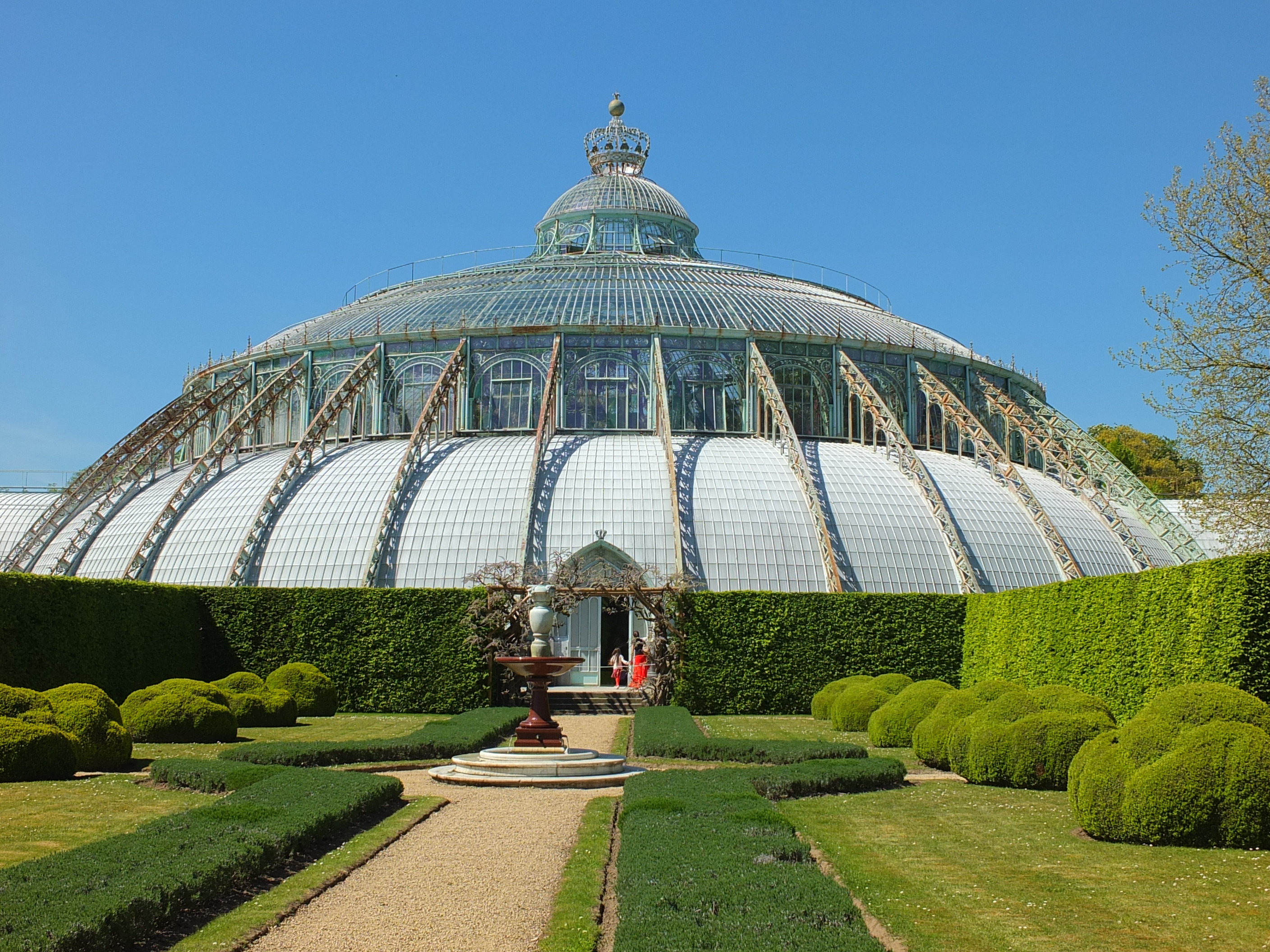
Winter Garden

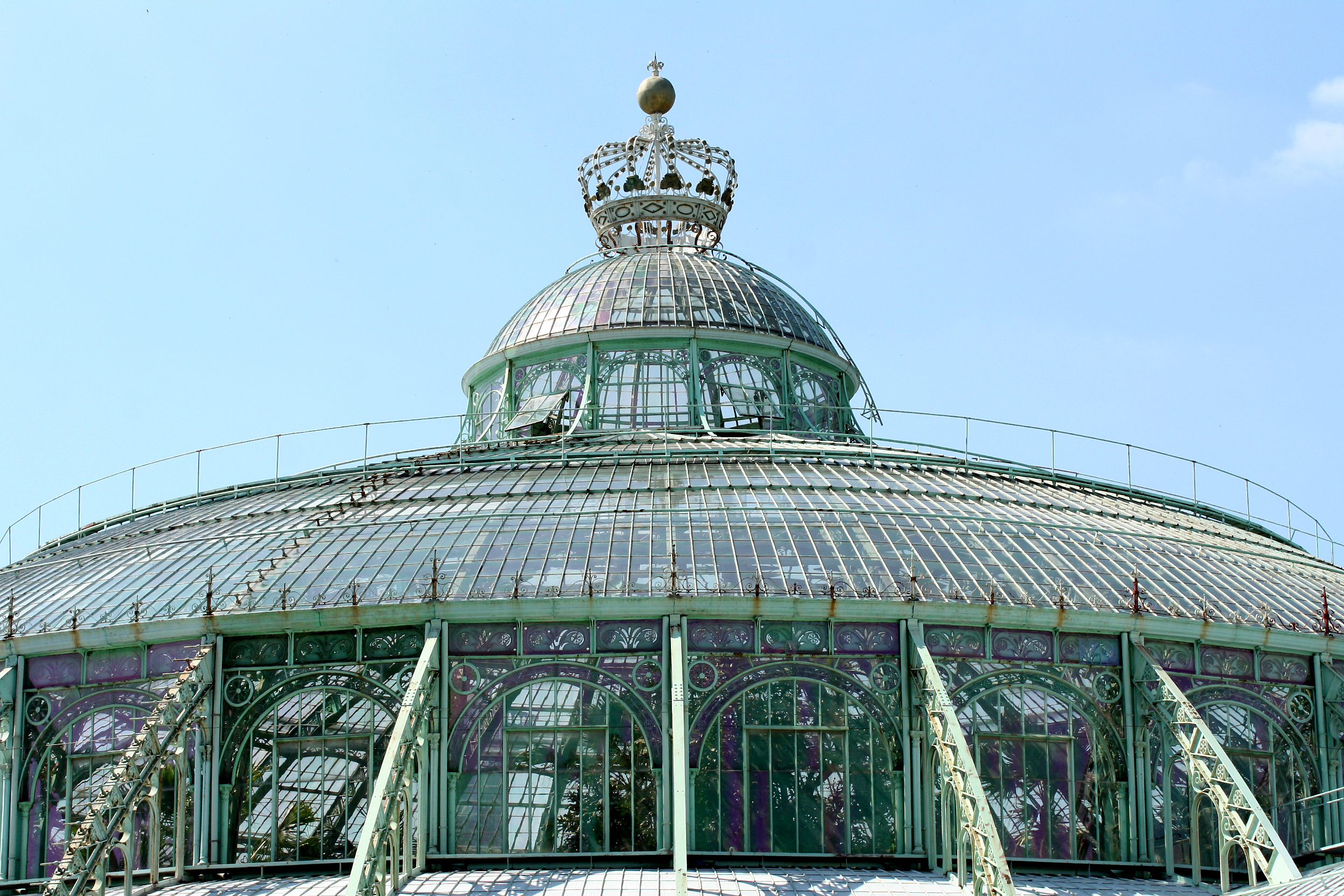
Closeup of the Winter Garden's roof

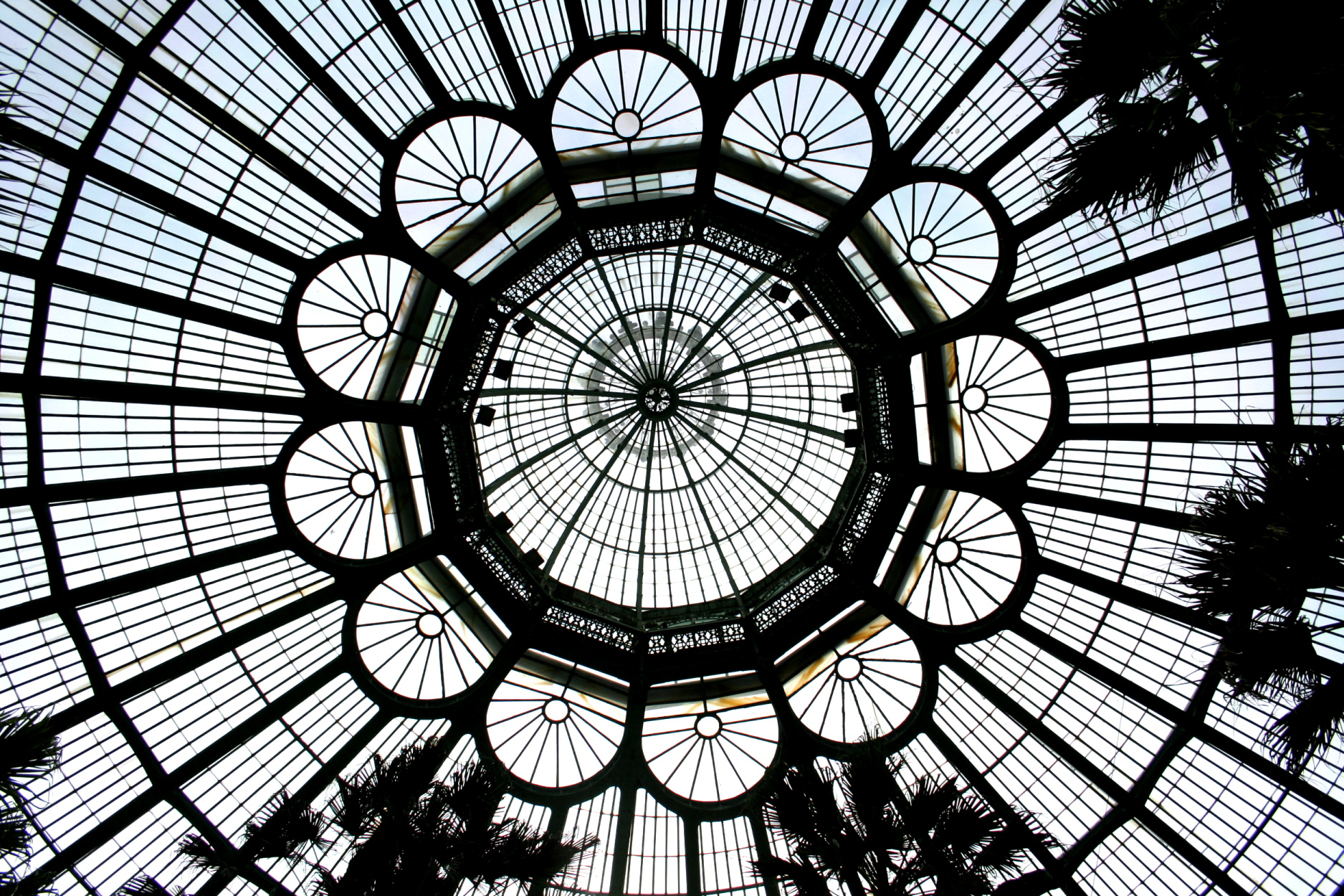
Under the dome of the Winter Garden

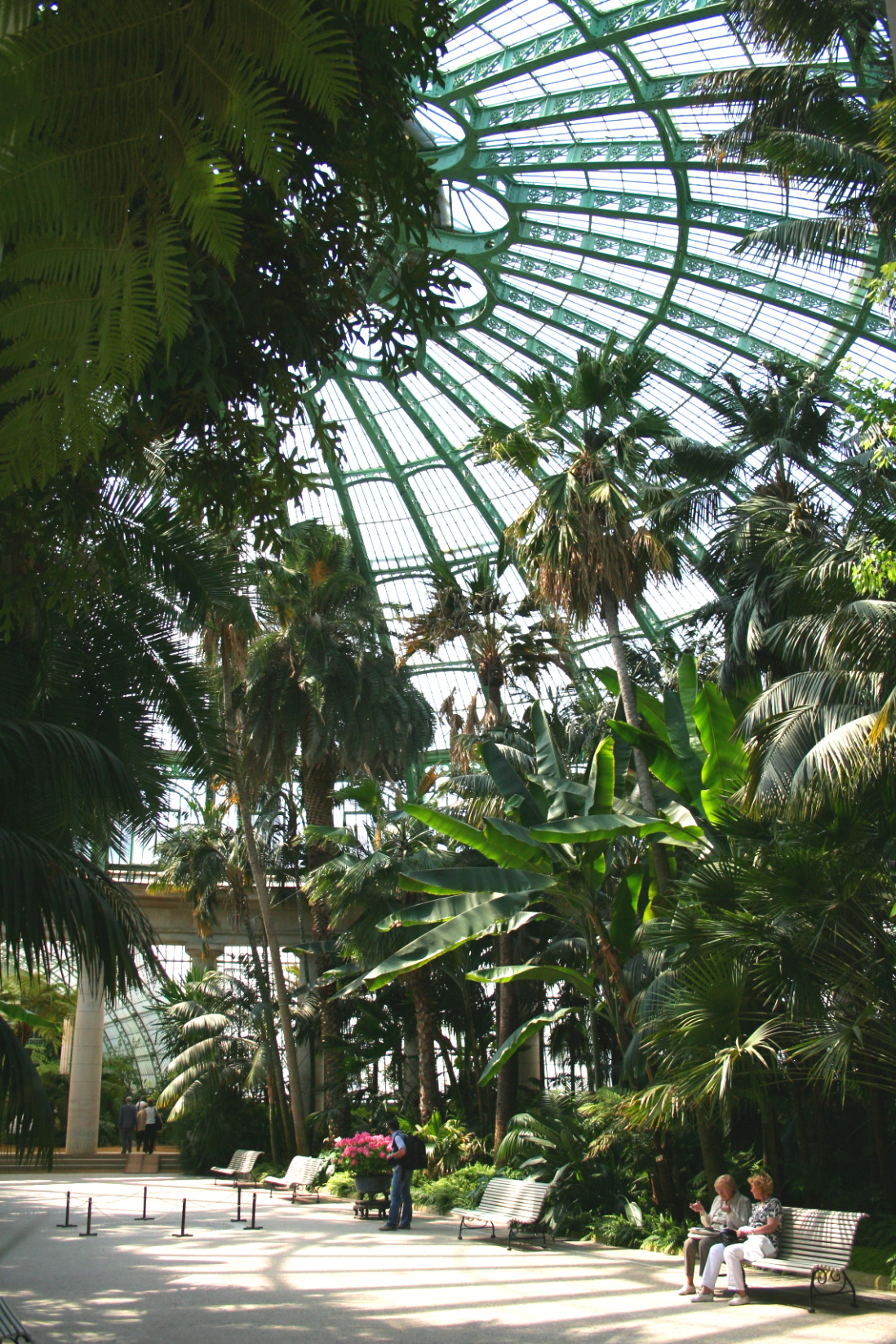
Interior of the Winter Garden

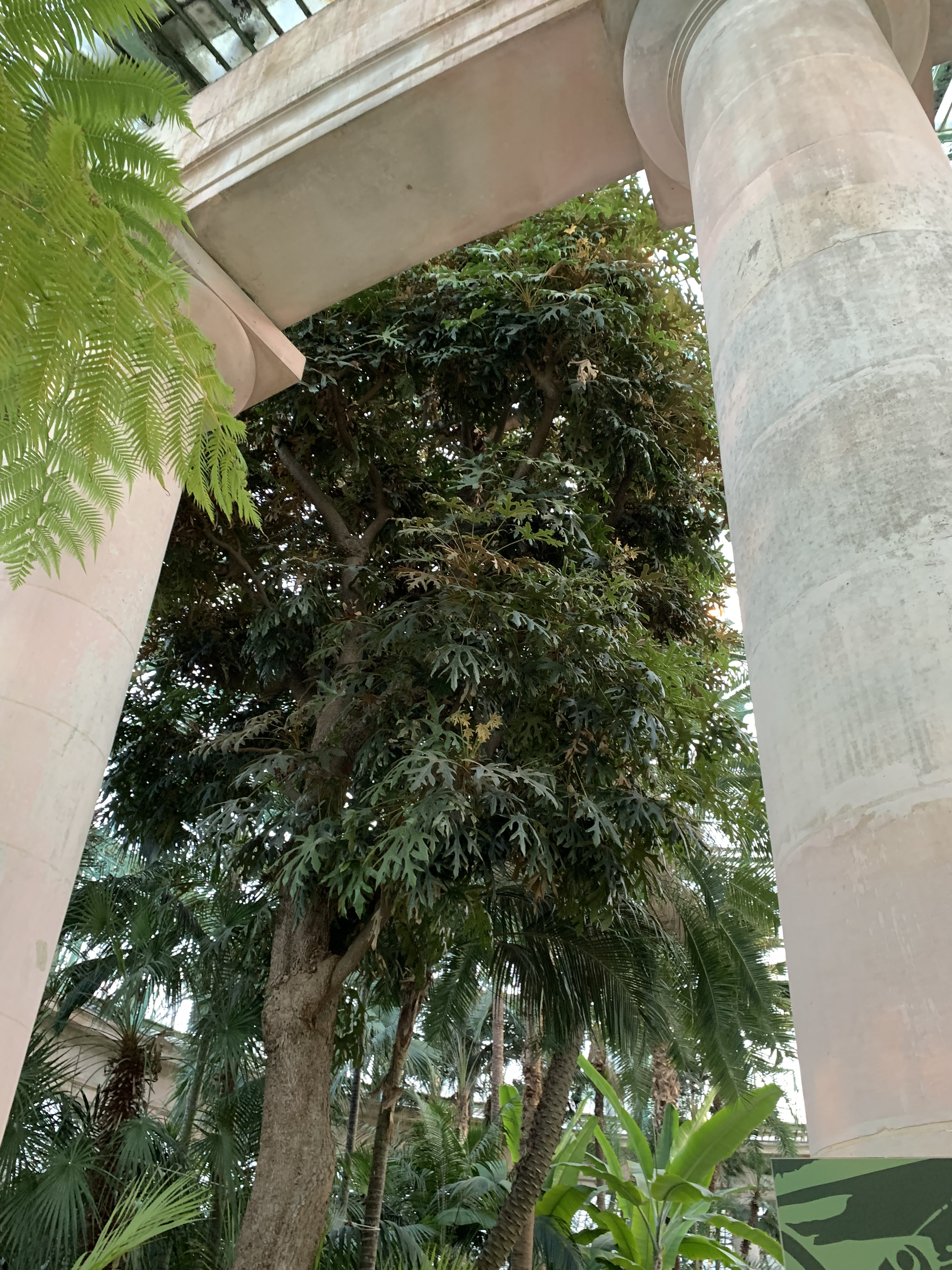
Oreopanax dactylifolius, present since the time of Leopold II

=== Other greenhouses ===
Between 1885 and 1887, Balat designed the Palm Greenhouse, the Congo Greenhouse, the Diana Greenhouse, and the Embarcadère Greenhouse. The latter consists of two parallel compartments under a barrel vault, the second of which contains a dome supported by iron Corinthian columns. It is decorated with Chinese vases and two statues by the sculptor Charles Van der Stappen (The Dawn and The Evening). Finally, in 1893, the Iron Church was added, a neo-Byzantine ensemble surrounded by wreath chapels, the dome of which is supported by twenty columns of Scottish granite. This greenhouse is therefore also officially called the Chapel Greenhouse.

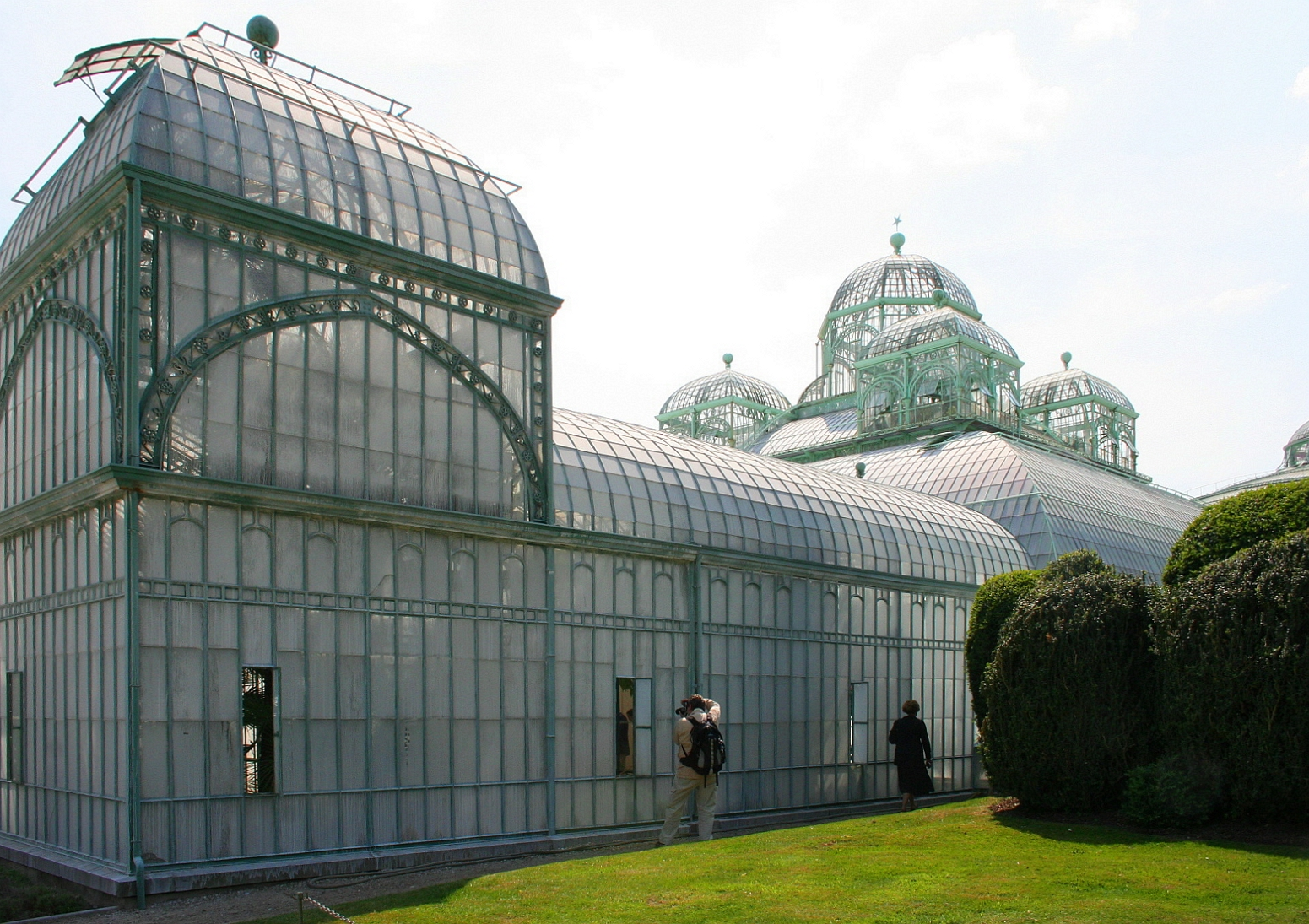
Embarcadère Greenhouse and Congo Greenhouse

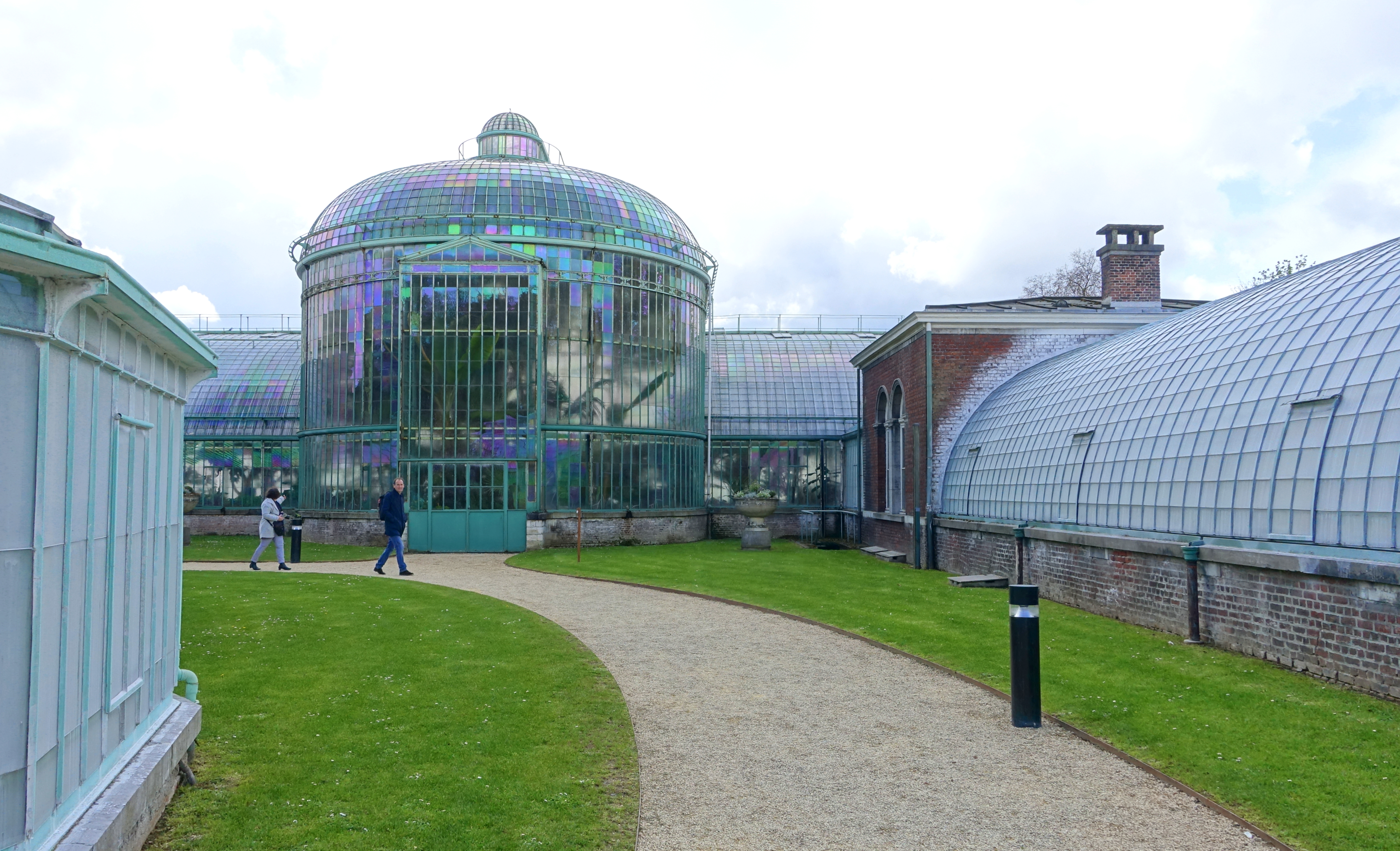
Greenhouse view

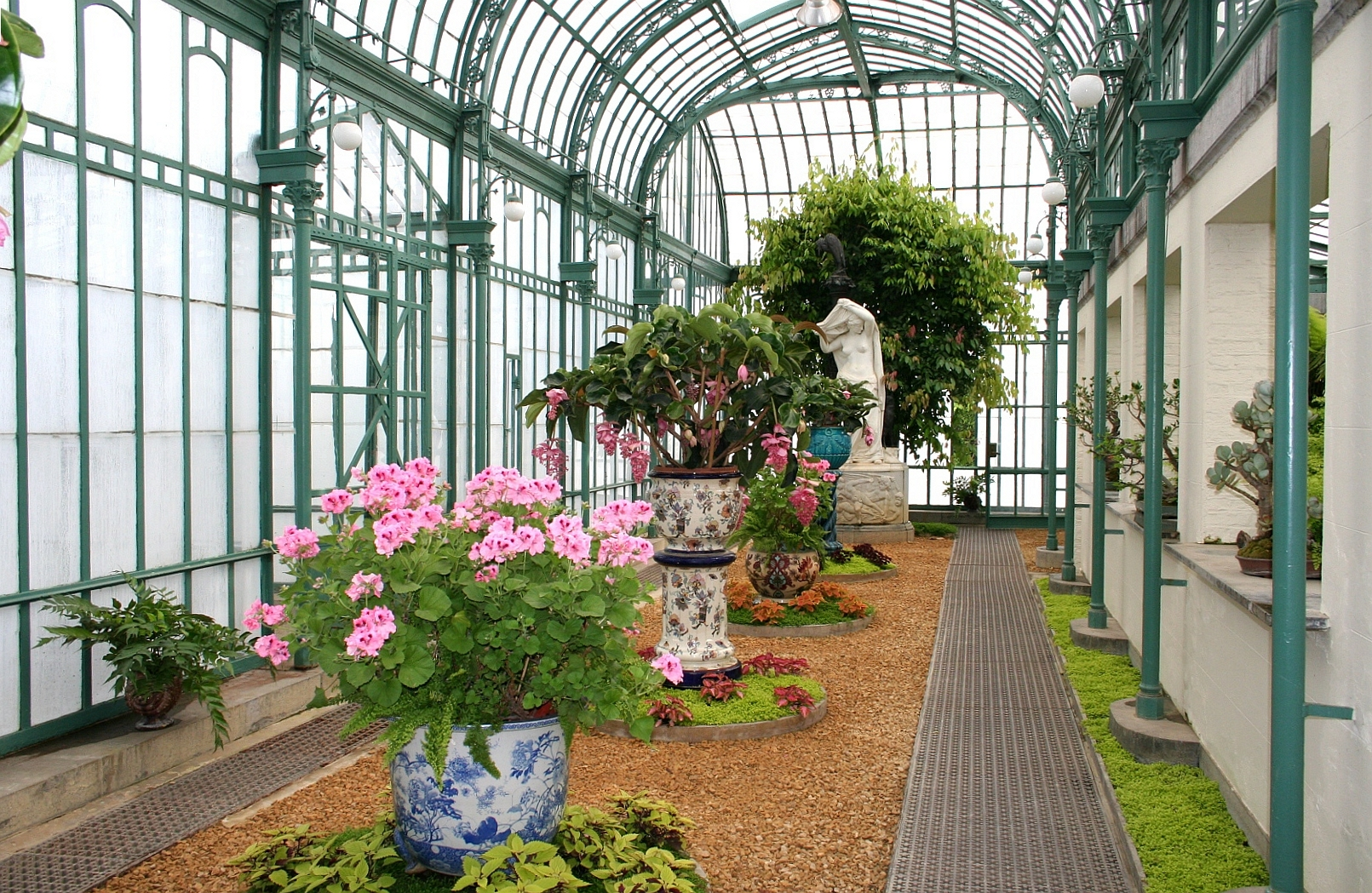
Interior of the Embarcadère Greenhouse

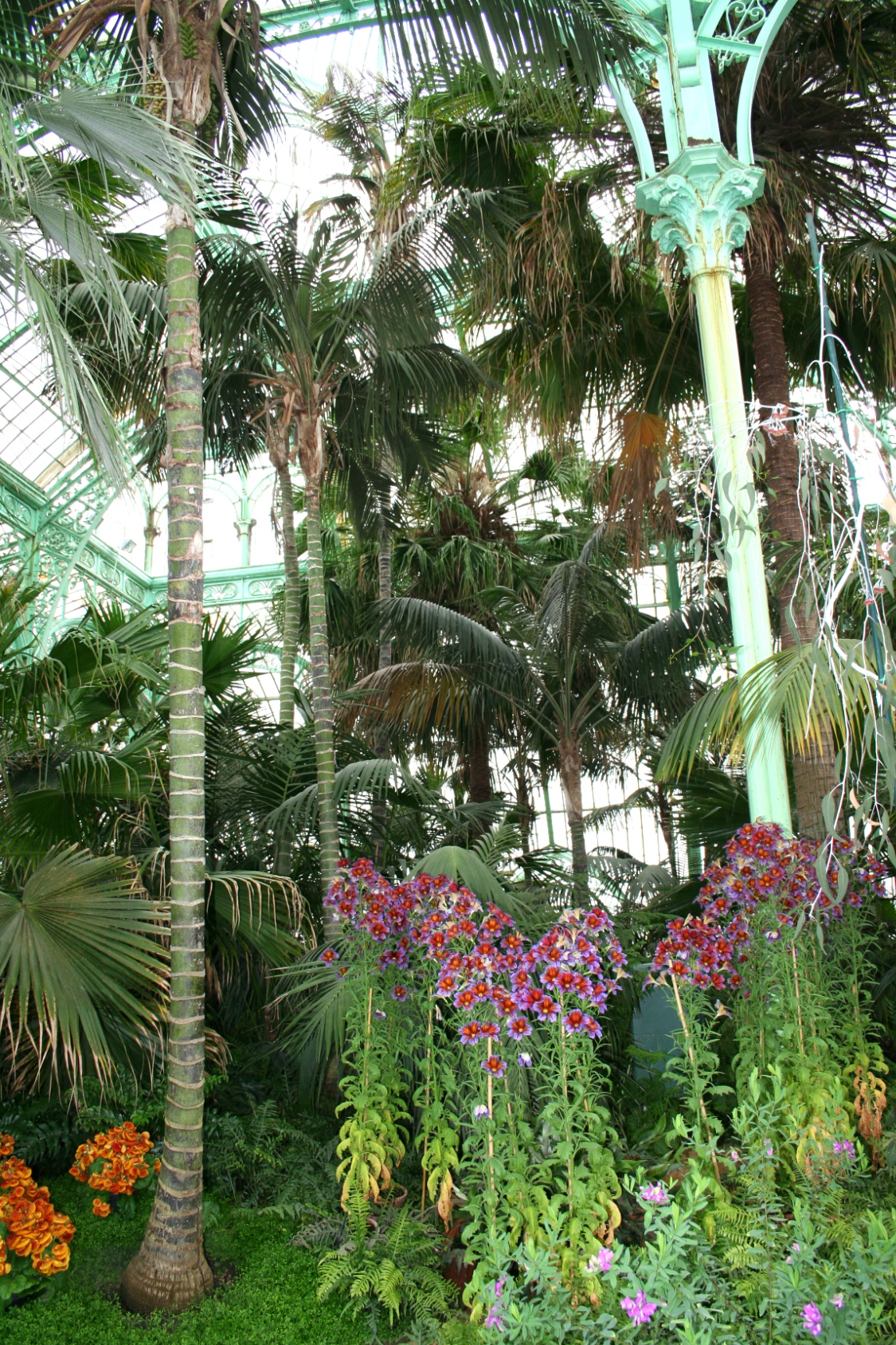
Interior of the Congo Greenhouse

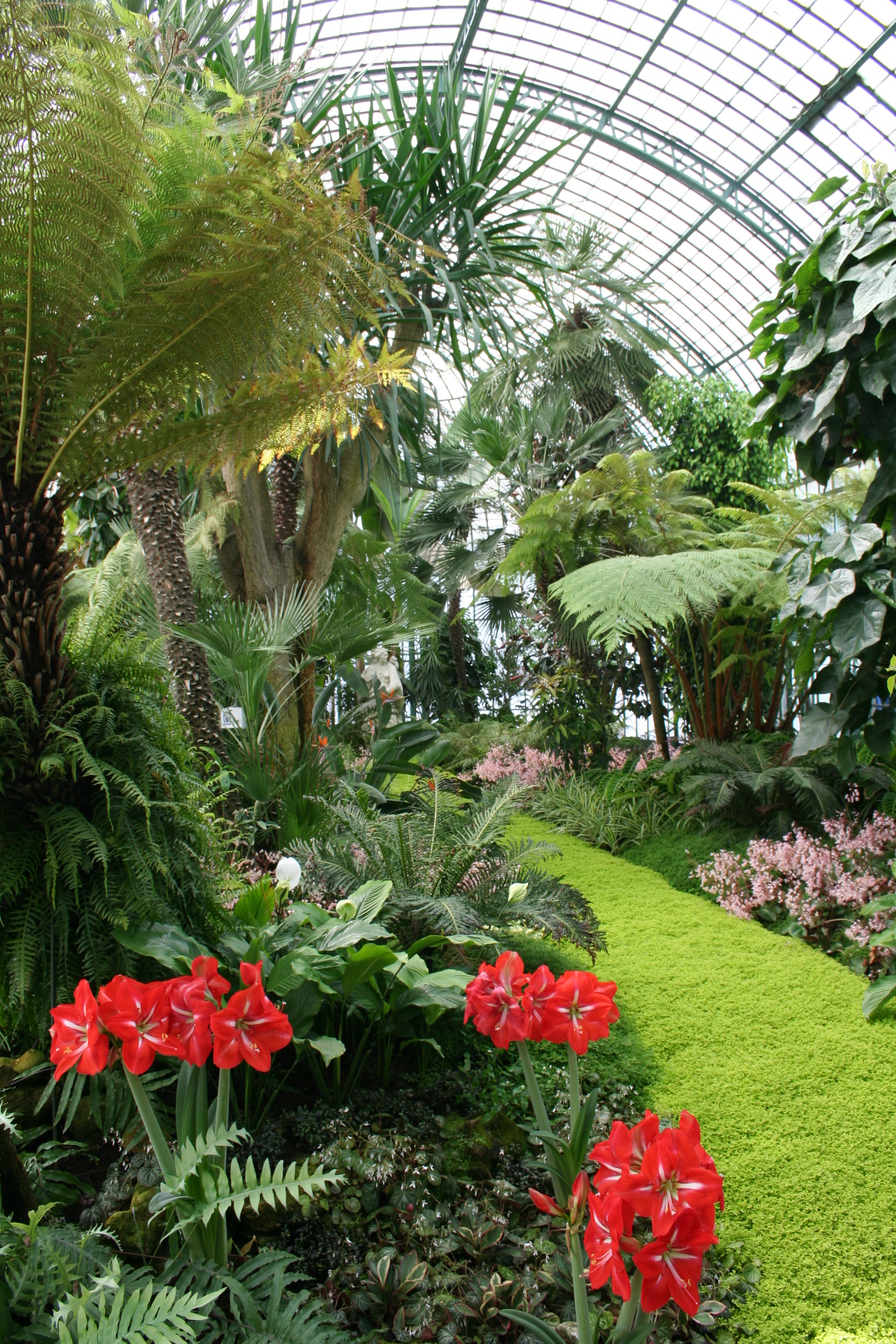
Interior of the Diana Greenhouse

== Royal Botanic Collection ==
The Royal Botanic Collection is home to old African plants and various species of flowers, which are cultivated inside the royal greenhouses for use at court. Though the collection has lost many cultivars since Leopold II's death, it is still famous. In 1909, the royal collection contained 314 species of camellias, with over 1,000 plants. Today, only 305 remain. This is the world's largest and oldest collection of camellias in a greenhouse. Leopold II's orange tree collection was also renowned, with 130 trees aged 200 to 300 years, and one even 400 years old. By the 1970s, however, only 45 trees were still alive.

== Visit ==
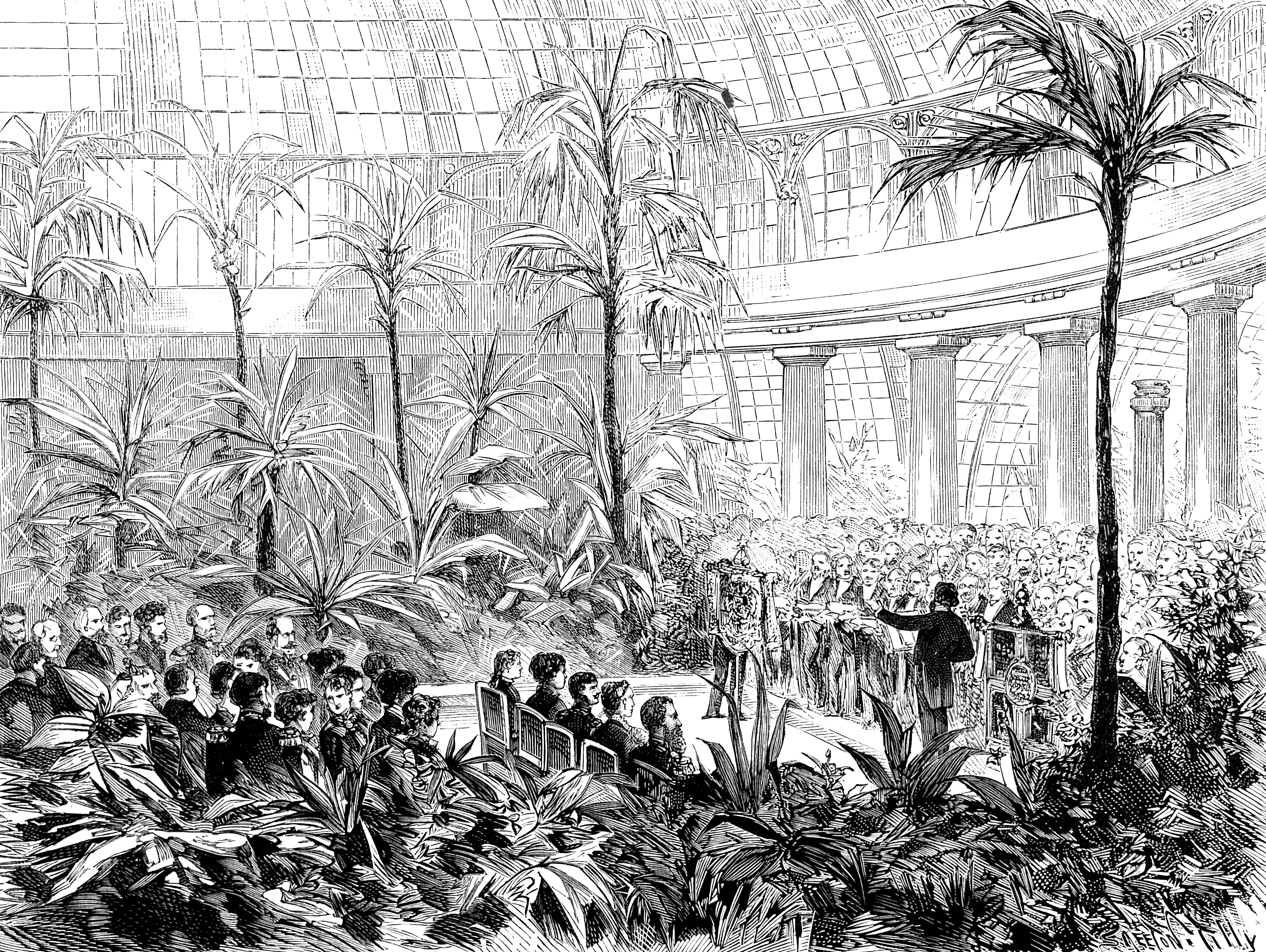
Engagement of Rudolf of Austria and Princess Stéphanie of Belgium in the Winter Garden, 1880

The royal complex is only open to visitors for a two-week period each year in April–May, when most of the flowers are in full bloom. During this period, visitors can walk through the complex and view the exotic plant and flower collections, some of which have been brought back from expeditions to the Congo for Leopold II.

Other times, the greenhouses are visited by heads of state during official visits. Famous visitors have included:

- Crown Prince Rudolf of Austria and Princess Stéphanie of Belgium were engaged in the new Winter Garden (1880).
- Queen Elizabeth II and Prince Philip of the United Kingdom (1966)
- Pope John Paul II (1985)
- Laura Bush, First Lady of the United States (2001)
- Melania Trump, First Lady of the United States (2017)
- King Willem-Alexander and Queen Máxima of the Netherlands (2023)

== Gallery ==
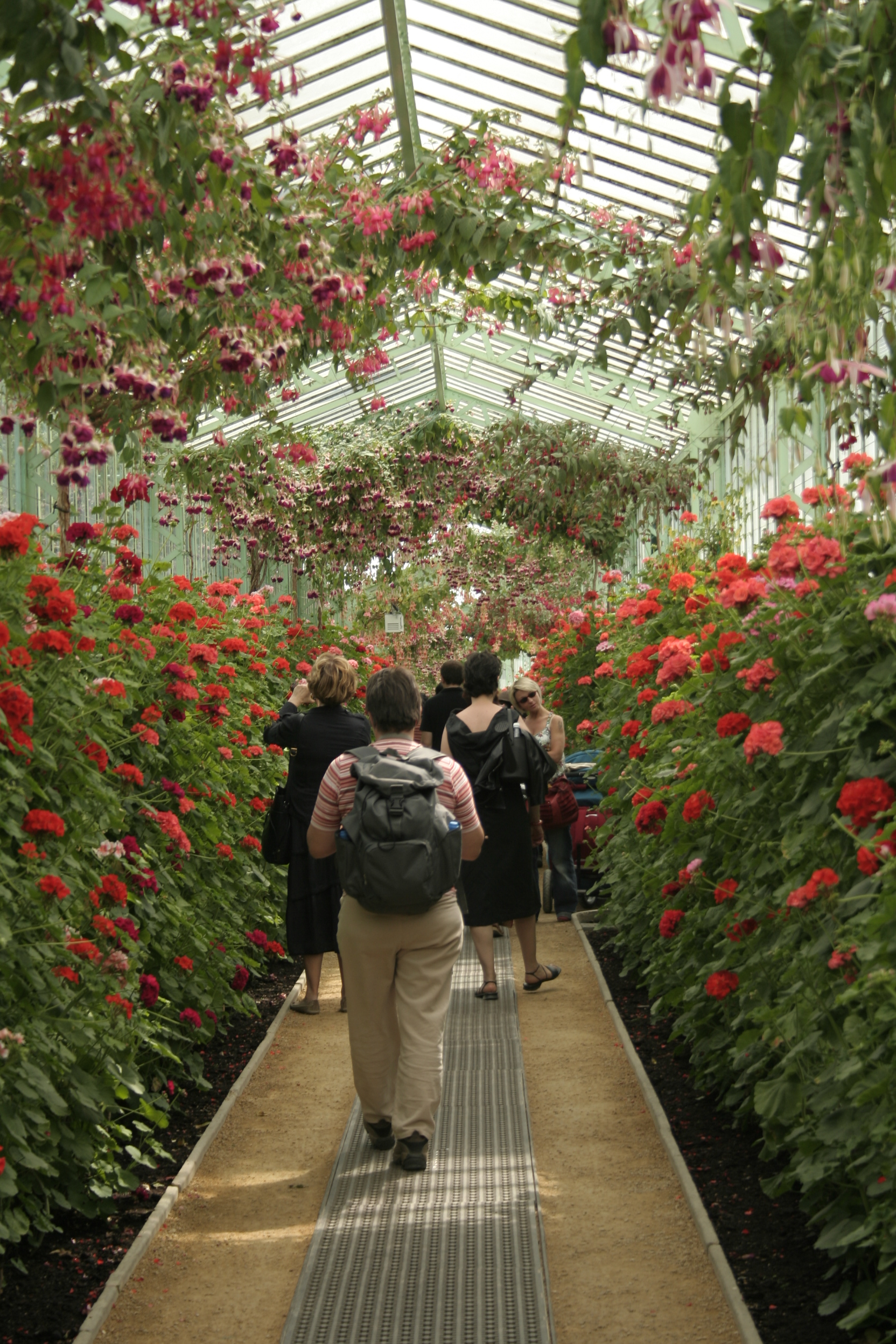
The long glass gallery in bloom

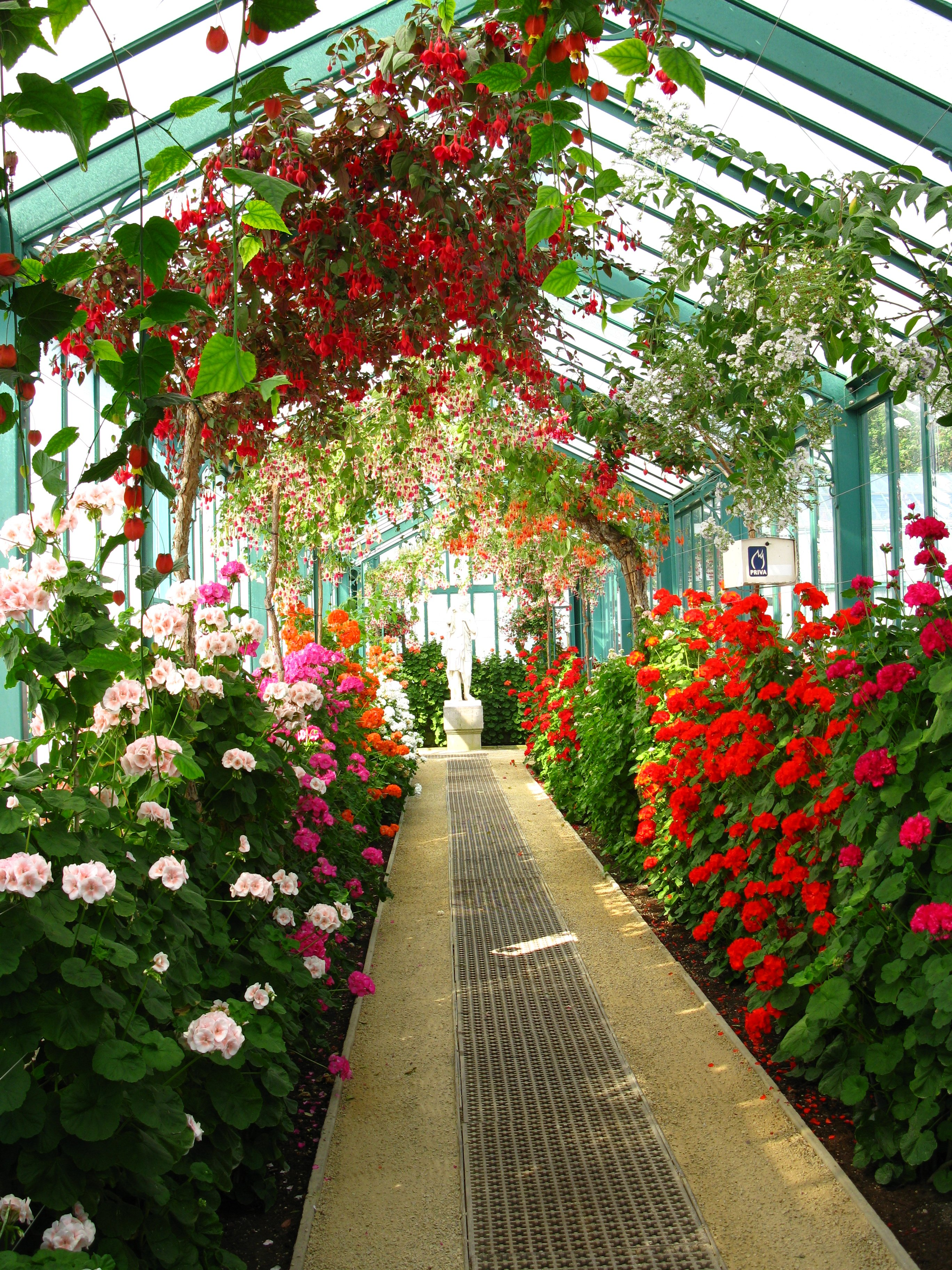
Gallery of geraniums and fuchsias

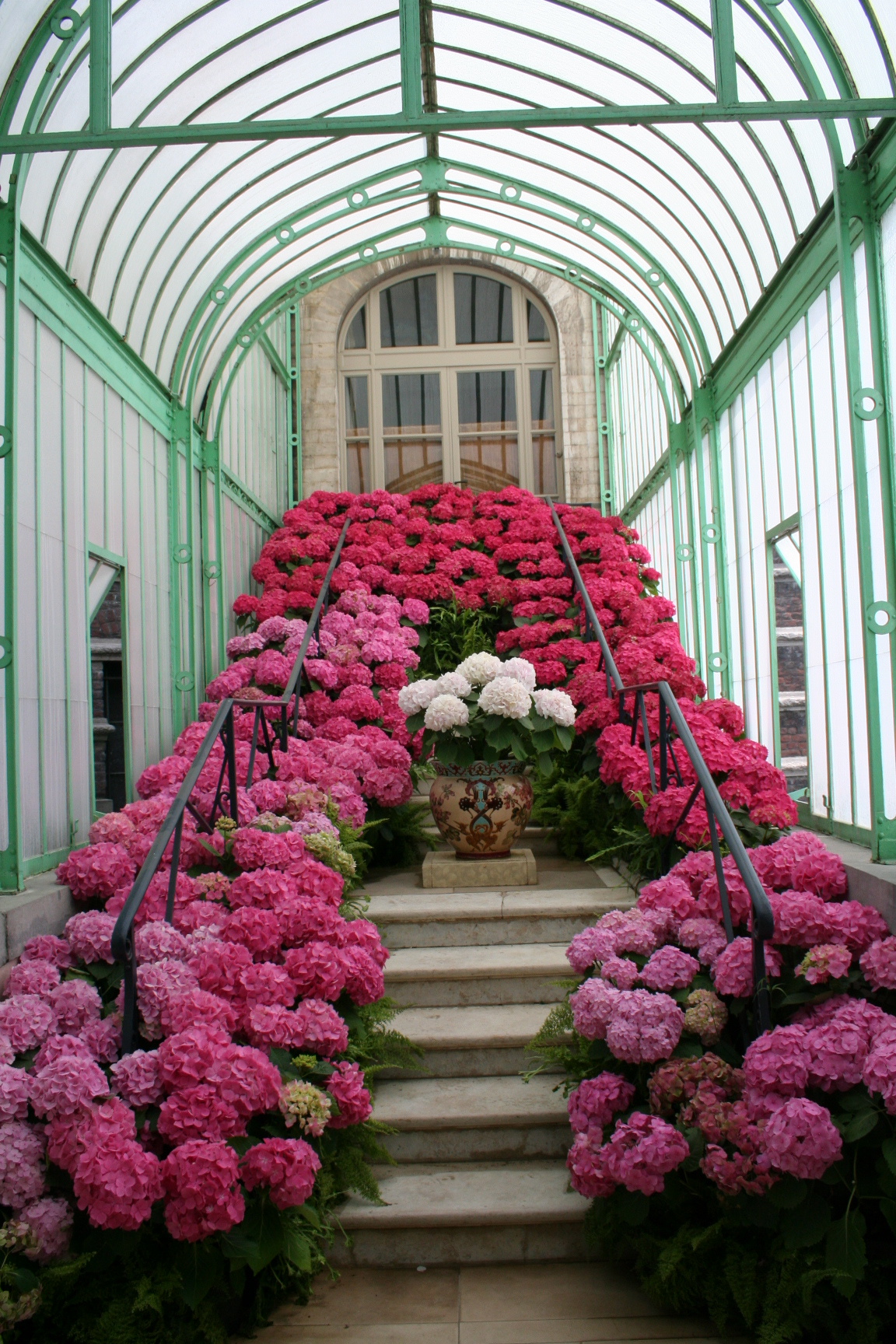
Staircase to the Palm Pavilion

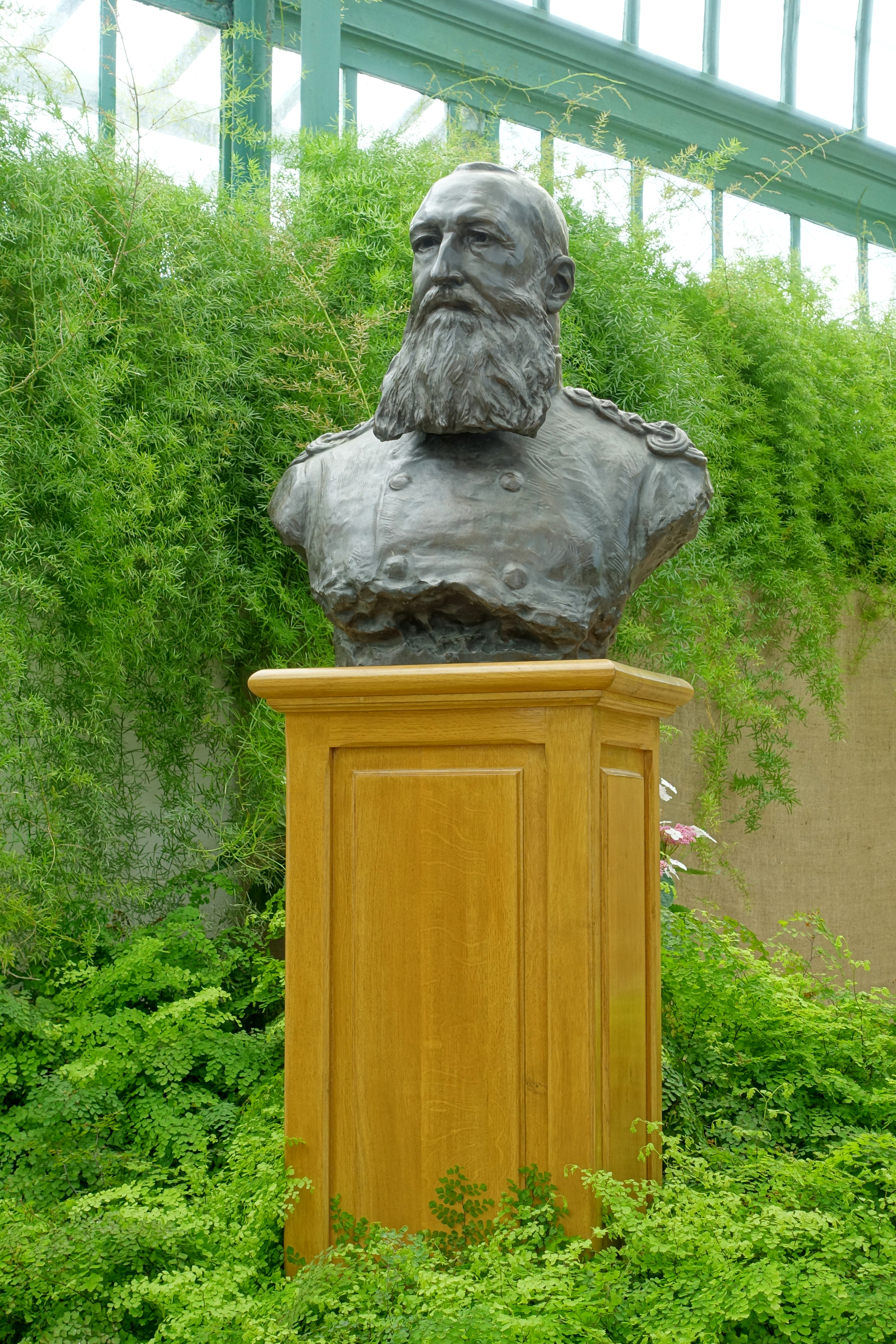
Bust of Leopold II by Thomas Vinçotte

== See also ==
- List of parks and gardens in Brussels
- Royal Trust (Belgium)
- History of Brussels
- Belgium in the long nineteenth century
