= Heidi De Pauw =

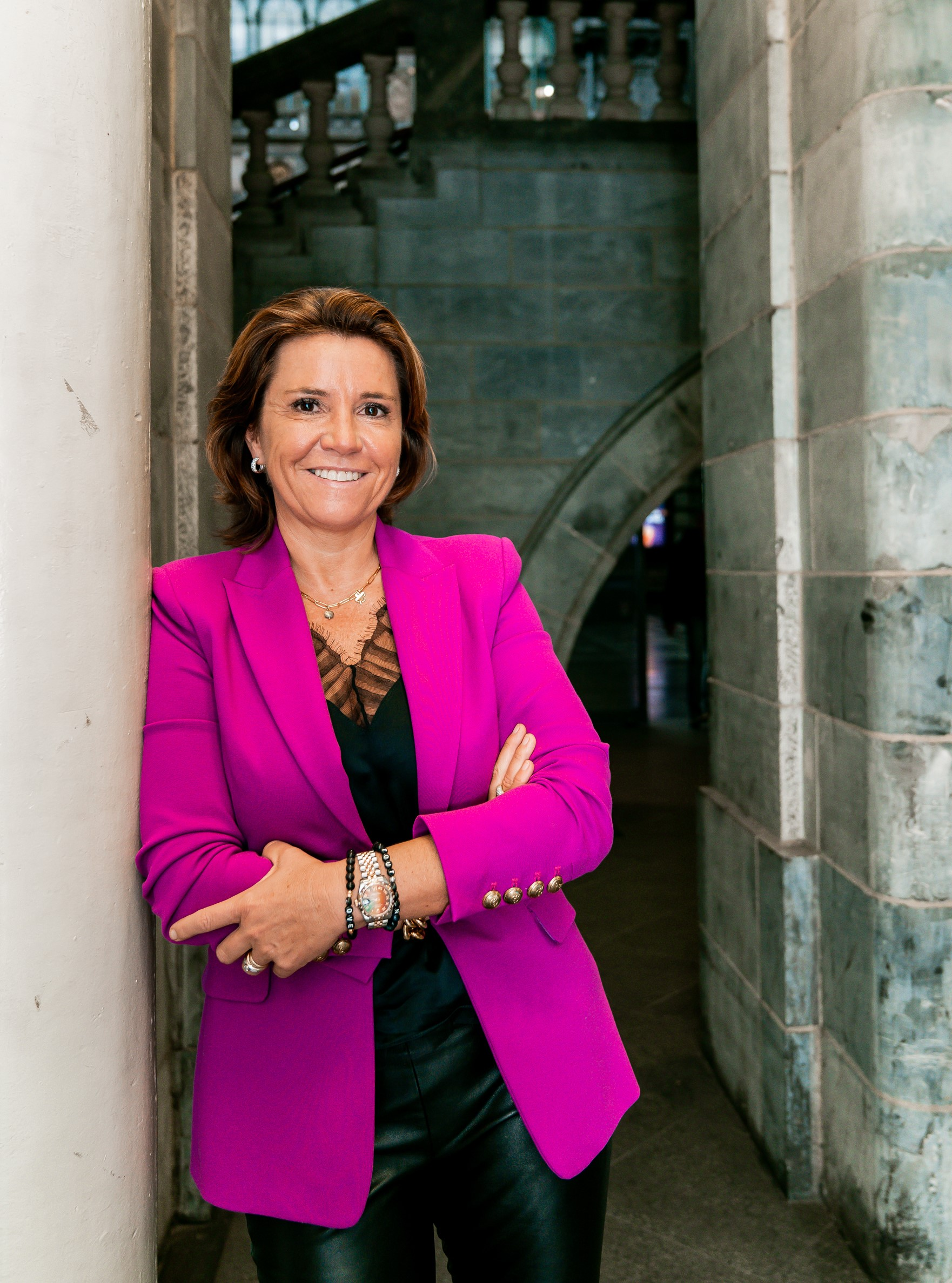
- Born: February 18, 1972 (age 54); Aalst, Belgium
- Occupation: Human Rights Activist
- Known for: CEO of Child Focus

Heidi De Pauw (born February 18, 1972, in Aalst, Belgium) is a human rights activist and former CEO of Child Focus, the Belgian Foundation for Missing and Sexually Exploited Children. Since September 2024 she has been country director of Enabel for Palestine & Jordan, to manage the existing program there but also to develop regional approaches for the Near and Middle East. She is a regular keynote speaker, trainer, and expert for international programs on children's rights, missing and sexually exploited children, and children in conflict zones.

== Early life and education ==
Heidi De Pauw was born on February 18, 1972, in Aalst, Belgium. She has a master's degree in Criminological Sciences from the University of Ghent and a degree in Human and Social Sciences from the University of Patras, Greece. She also has a degree in Business Administration from the EHSAL Management School in Brussels.

== Career ==
De Pauw began her career at the Home Affairs Prevention Service, managing safety and prevention projects related to drug abuse and disappearances. Shortly after Child Focus was founded in 1998, she became one of the first case managers, assisting victims of disappearances and sexual exploitation and their families. Three years later, she became study and development manager in the newly created Child Focus Study and Development department, where she developed and implemented national and EU prevention projects.

As Secretary General of Eurochild, De Pauw led the European non-profit organization focussed on fighting child poverty and social exclusion. In 2005, she became Director of PAG-ASA, a specialized center for victims of trafficking, where she served for six years.

At the end of 2011, she returned to Child Focus as CEO. De Pauw is former Deputy Chairwoman of Missing Children Europe, the European Federation for Missing and Sexually Exploited Children, and is now Special Representative of the Patron's Council of Missing Children Europe. She is President of the Board of Minor Ndako and Juna vzw, a shelter for unaccompanied minors and underage victims of human trafficking. She is a former board member of several organizations, including V-Europe, and Tout Bien Okidoki. She is a board member of the Queen Paola Foundation and the VRT, the public broadcaster of the Flemish Community. Also, she is a patron of WOMENPOL, the Belgian Network of Policewomen.

Until May 2021, Heidi De Pauw was a Member of the Board of Directors of the National Lottery. Since August 2022, she is a member of the advisory board of Debateville, a debate program.

In 2022, Heidi De Pauw was appointed a Commander in the Order of the Crown for her contributions as CEO of Child Focus in the transfer of 40 Ukrainian disabled children and Belgian children from Syrian prison camps to Belgium.

Since June 2023, Heidi De Pauw has been founder and vice-president of Antwerp Diamonds FC, a women's football club. In December 2023, she joined the Board of Directors of INHOPE, the global network against CSAM. In April 2024, Heidi joined the Biz Board Lotto Super League (Pro League). In 2024, Heidi De Pauw left the position of CEO at Child Focus.

Since September 2024 she has been country director of Enabel for Jordan, to manage the existing program there but also to develop regional approaches for the Near and Middle East.

De Pauw was a mentor in the program "Inspiring Mentor & Young Leaders" and an independent coach for "Gangmakers," the academy of talents of the Open VLD (Liberal Party). She chaired the Parliamentary Working Group on the protection of children at the federal level, composed of field experts, representatives of Cabinets, and members of Parliament. As an expert and trainer for ICMPD, she specializes in human trafficking and the sexual exploitation of particularly vulnerable groups, such as minors.

== Publications ==
- Makri, O., & De Pauw, H. (1994). "Information on the Convention on the Rights of the Child in Greece", in: European Course on Children's Rights Gent, ICP-94B-114/10.
- De Pauw, H. (2002). "De Verdwijning van niet begeleide minderjarigen en minderjarige slachtoffers van mensenhandel". ISBN 90-7118-01-2. Also published in English and French: "The disappearance of unaccompanied minors and minors, victim of trafficking in human beings". ISBN 90-7118-03-9. "La disparition de mineurs non accompagnés et de mineurs victimes de la traite des êtres humains". ISBN 90-7118-02-0.
- De Pauw, H. (2002). "Child Focus. De cijfers." in: Seksuele Uitbuiting van Kinderen/L’exploitation Sexuelle des enfants, Custodes, Cahiers voor politie- en justitievraagstukken/thématiques de la police et de la justice, Politeia.
- De Schrijver, I., & De Pauw, H. (2000). "Child focus. Het Europees Centrum voor Vermiste en Seksueel Uitgebuite Kinderen", in: Praktische Gids: De positie van het slachtoffer binnen de strafrechtspleging. ISBN 978-2-930287-12-6.
- De Pauw, H. (2003). "De Verdwijning van niet begeleide minderjarigen en minderjarige slachtoffers van mensenhandel", Panopticon, 9-30.
- Vermeulen, G., & De Pauw, H. (2003). "Missing and sexually exploited children in the EU. Epidemiological data", Antwerp-Apeldoorn, Maklu.
- Schmidburg, T., De Pauw, H., & De Schrijver, I. (2003). "Directory of civil society organisations working in the field of missing and sexually exploited children", Antwerp-Apeldoorn, Maklu.
- Vermeulen, G., & De Pauw, H. (2003). "Cooperation between civil society organisations and law enforcement services in the area of missing children. Possibilities and limits from a European legal perspective", Antwerp-Apeldoorn, Maklu.
- De Pauw, H., & Habils, K. (2005). "Een groot geheim in een klein hoofdje", Garant (book as part of a project for primary education on sexual abuse).
- De Pauw, H. (2005). "Mid-term review of the EU’s Lisbon Strategy threatens measures to counter child poverty", Children in Europe, 33.
- Vermeulen, G., & De Pauw, H. (2005). "Introduction" & "Definitions of sexually exploitation of children and missing children. Epidemiological data in the new member states", in: Vermeulen, G. (ed.), "Missing and sexually exploited children in the enlarged EU", Antwerp-Apeldoorn, Maklu, p. 11-18.
- De Pauw, H. (2018). "Geen Paniek! Waarom we onze kinderen met een gerust hart kunnen loslaten…", ("No Panic. Why we can let children grow up in confidence"). Editor: Houtekiet.
- De Pauw, H. (2016). Closing word in "Sterke meisjes huilen niet. Vijf jaar in handen van een tienerpooier" ("Strong girls don’t cry. Five years in the hands of teenage pimps") by Lore T. & Frauke Joossen. Editor: Lannoo.
- De Pauw, H. (2022). Foreword in "Dijende Kringen. Kinderlokker zet buurt op stelten" ("Thigh Circles. Child molester disturb neighborhood") by Kris Vanhoeck. Editor: Ertsberg.
- De Pauw, H. (2022). Contribution in "Een alledaags wonder. 50 verhalen over verbinding en betrokkenheid" (An everyday wonder. 50 stories about connection and commitment.) by Steven Eggermont, Peter Vermeersch ed. Editor: Lannoo Campus.
- De Pauw, H. (2024). "Tussen Gruwel en Hoop. 30 jaar op de bres voor de rechten van minderjarigen.", ("Between Horror and Hope: 30 Years of Defending the Rights of Minors"). Editor: Borgerhoff-Lambrigts.
