= 01708 =

National dialling code for Romford in the United Kingdom

United Kingdom area code for Romford
- National calling: 01708
- International calling: +44 1708
- Conservation: Yes
- Active since: 16 April 1995
- Previous code: 0708
- Number format: 01708 xxxxxx

Coverage
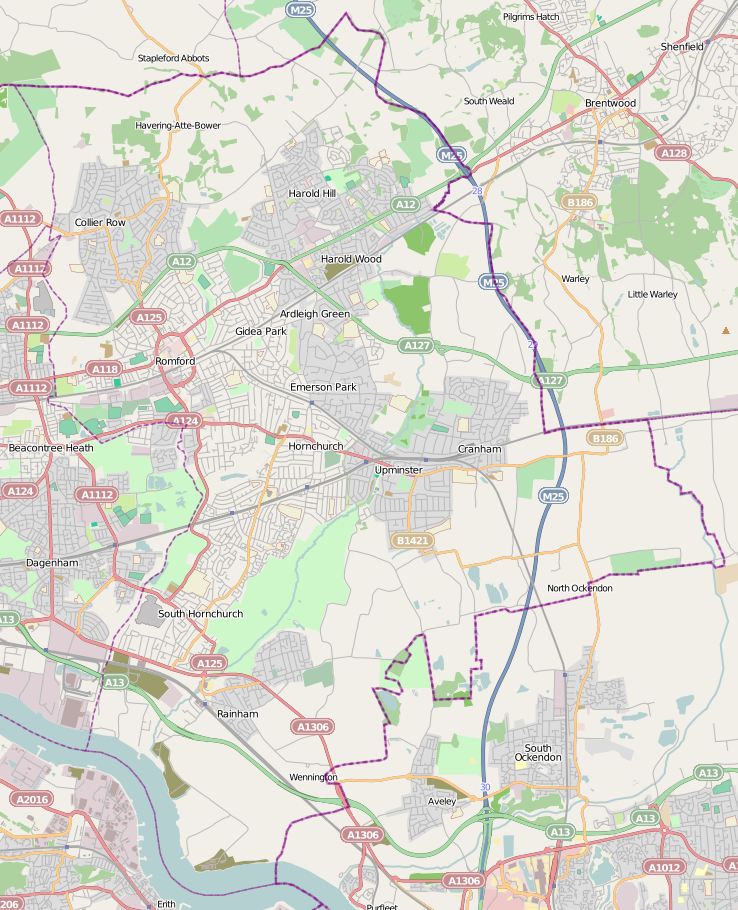
- Area served: Havering; Purfleet; South Ockendon; Stapleford

01708 is the national dialling code for Romford in the United Kingdom. The area it serves includes almost all of the London Borough of Havering and some adjacent areas. When STD codes were first introduced, Romford was assigned 0708 and 0402 was used for the rest of the current code area. After a sequence of changes in the early 1990s, culminating with PhONEday, the current 01708 code became active on 16 April 1995. All subscriber numbers within the area code consist of six digits. The code is used at eight telephone exchanges as part a linked numbering scheme. In common with all other British area codes the initial '0' is a trunk prefix that is not required when dialling Romford from abroad.

== History ==
When STD codes were initially assigned, Romford was given the mnemonic code RO8 (corresponding to 708 on the rotary dial), with Hornchurch and the rest of the area using the HO2 (402) code. With the transition to all-figure dialling which ended the practice of representing STD codes with letters in 1966, and including the trunk prefix, these became 0708 and 0402. The 0402 code covered seven exchanges in a linked numbering scheme, with an additional digit for each exchange, as below. Internally, the 0402 code was translated to routing digits by registers to the same string of digits as 0708 plus an additional 8, which corresponded to the 8 in the local code from Romford Group Switching Centre to the local exchange. This technique was used to keep the dialled string down to the 10 digit limit that was imposed (though Stapleford only had 3 digit local numbers and South Ockendon 4 digits and so these could be dialled as 0708 8x xxx as well as the official 0402x xxx / xxxx.)

Dialling code	Exchange name
040 22	Upminster
040 23	Ingrebourne
040 24	Hornchurch
040 25	South Ockendon
040 26	Purfleet
040 27	Rainham
040 28	Stapleford

The two codes operated as a single group for charging purposes in which all calls were priced at local rate. Additionally (and as is usual) calls to and from the adjacent charge groups were charged as local. (Note: Calls to and from numbers now in the 01268, 01277, 01322, 01375, 01474, 01689, 01959, 01992 and 020 codes were charged at local rate.)

The area was adjacent to the London telephone area and formed part of the London Telecommunications Region set up in the 1930s. The Upminster exchange was the last in the London region to convert from manual service in 1970 and the first to use the TXK system. The Stapleford exchange was the last in the region to use the UAX 13 Strowger automatic exchange system. After being decommissioned in 1992 the exchange, including the original building, became a working exhibit at Avoncroft Museum of Historic Buildings.

In common with exchanges in areas adjacent to the London 01 area, local dialling codes were assigned. For example, Romford 5 digit numbers (which began with 2, 4, or 6) could be reached from 01 numbers by dialling 70 (instead of 0708), Romford 6 digit numbers (which began with 75 and were served by Romford South exchange) could be reached by dialling 3 instead of 0708 and Hornchurch numbers (5 digit) could be reached by dialling 49 instead of 04024.

During the 1980s and early 1990s exchanges in the 0402 area gradually transitioned to 0708 and subscriber numbers were standardised at six digits. The 1979/80 code book shows South Ockendon as the first exchange to change code and subscriber numbers. By 1983 the South Ockendon change was shown to be complete and Purfleet numbers were in the process of being amended.

Exchange	Upminster	Ingrebourne	Hornchurch	Rainham	Stapleford	Romford	South Ockendon	Purfleet
Old numbering	(040 22) xxxxx	(040 23) xxxxx	(040 24) xxxxx	(040 27) xxxxx	(040 28) xxx	(0708) xxxxx	(040 25) xxxx	(040 26) xxxx
New numbering	0708 2xxxxx	0708 3xxxxx	0708 4xxxxx	0708 5xxxxx	0708 688xxx	0708 7xxxxx	0708 85xxxx	0708 86xxxx

After this was completed the code for the whole area changed on PhONEday in 1995 to 01708. The 0402 code was reused for mobile telephone numbers until it was abandoned again during the Big Number Change in 2000.

== Coverage ==
The code serves almost the whole of the London Borough of Havering in Greater London (Note: The Hornchurch Marshes area is in the 020 area code) with exchanges at Romford, Hornchurch, Ingrebourne (in Harold Wood), Rainham and Upminster. There are three exchanges outside the borough in Essex at Purfleet, South Ockendon and Stapleford.

Code	Exchange	Residential premises	Business premises
LNHOR	Hornchurch	26,746	885
LNING	Ingrebourne	18,050	528
LNPFT	Purfleet	6,329	657
LNRAI	Rainham	13,727	524
LNROM	Romford	30,571	1,563
LNSFD	Stapleford	272	71
LNSOK	South Ockendon	8,004	183
LNUPM	Upminster	9,708	407

== Number allocation ==
Under the National Telephone Numbering Plan the code operates with the following sub-ranges:

01708
0xxxxx 1xxxxx	national dialling only, not issued locally
2xxxxx 3xxxxx 4xxxxx 5xxxxx 6xxxxx 7xxxxx 8xxxxx 9xxxxx	local numbers

The area code is subject to number conservation and the regulator Ofcom restricts the size of number blocks that are allocated. The area code is expected to run out of subscriber numbers in 2028.
