= PH-1 =

PH-1, PH 1, PH.1, PH1 or variant, may refer to:

- PH1 (star system) (Planet Hunters 1), the first system with a planet (PH1b - Planet Hunters 1 b) discovered by Planet Hunters; the star system also called KIC 4862625 or Kepler-64
- Hall PH-1, a model of the Hall PH airplane
- PH1, a postcode in the PH postcode area of the United Kingdom
- PH1, IAU Minor Planet Center nomenclature for naming asteroids
  - 1988 PH1, see 4768 Hartley
  - 1991 PH1
  - 1992 PH1, see 12320 Loschmidt
  - 1994 PH1, see (9391) 1994 PH1
  - 1999 PH1, see 19617 Duhamel
- pH-1 (rapper), a South Korean rapper
- PH-1, the official codename for the Essential Phone, Andy Rubin's first-generation Android device

== See also ==
- PhONEday, change to telephone numbering in the United Kingdom
- PHL (disambiguation), including Phl
- PHI (disambiguation)
- PH (disambiguation)
