= Big Number Change =

2000 overhaul of the UK telephone dialling plan

The Big Number Change addressed various issues with the telephone dialling plan in the United Kingdom, during the late 1990s and early 2000s, when the country was running short of new telephone numbers.

== Overview ==
The first change was an update to a small number of geographic dialling codes in response to the rapid late-1990s growth of telecommunications and impending exhaustion of local numbers in several cities. The update greatly expanded the pool of available numbers within those places while retaining 'local dialling' (the ability to dial local numbers directly, without needing to dial an area code first). The change affected the dialling codes assigned to Cardiff, Coventry, London, Northern Ireland, Portsmouth and Southampton. The new numbers launched on 1 June 1999 and ran in parallel with the old numbers for a period until culminating in the large switch on 22 April 2000. All of these places moved to eight-digit local numbers ensuring sufficient local capacity for many decades (London saw a five-fold increase in capacity, for example). No other geographic area codes were affected.

The other set of changes affected mobile, non-geographic and premium rate numbers, completing a series of steps first detailed almost a decade earlier. In the early-1990s, mobile, non-geographic and premium rate services had used nine-digit numbers with various codes such as 0402, 0645, and 0898 scattered among the similar-looking geographic area codes such as 0384, 0562 and 0949. The number of available codes for new services was quickly dwindling. In 1995, PhONEday partially addressed this by altering all geographic area codes to begin 01, freeing up hundreds of codes beginning 02 to 09 for other uses. Existing mobile, non-geographic and premium rate services continued as before, using various codes from 02 to 09 and with nine-digit numbers.

In 1997 and 1998, mobile, non-geographic and premium rate numbers started to be issued with ten digits and using only specific new prefixes: 070 for personal numbers, 076 for pagers, 077xx, 078xx and 079xx for mobiles, 0800 and 0808 for freephone, 0845 and 0870 for non-geographic revenue-share numbers and 090x for premium rate numbers. Within each of these groups some smaller number blocks were held aside for the older 9-digit mobile, non-geographic and premium rate services to move into at a later date. The Big Number Change put those final parts into place. Mobile, pager and personal numbers that had not yet been moved to the 07 range were done so on 30 September 1999, and the old numbers remained in parallel until 28 April 2001.

At the end of the process, there were no numbers in the UK beginning 03, 04 or 06. Additionally, the 02, 05, 07, 08 and 09 ranges were only lightly used. With PhONEday in 1995 and the Big Number Change, the UK had achieved huge spare capacity for new services and simple to understand prefix groupings: 01 and 02 for geographic numbers, 070 for personal numbers, 076 for pagers, 07624, 077, 078 and 079 for mobiles, 0500 and 080 for freephone, 084 and 087 for non-geographic and 090 for premium rate. Further new allocations would initially conform only to those groupings. Over the following decade, the 030, 033, 034, 037, 055, 056, 074, 075, 091 and 098 ranges would also come into use for new services or for further expansion of old services.

== Geographic number changes ==
These changes set the following areas to use 02 area codes and eight-digit subscriber numbers.

=== Great Britain ===
Area	Before BNC	After BNC
Inner London	(0171) xxx xxxx	(020) 7xxx xxxx
Outer London	(0181) xxx xxxx	(020) 8xxx xxxx
Portsmouth	(01705) xxxxxx	(023) 92xx xxxx
Southampton	(01703) xxxxxx	(023) 80xx xxxx
Coventry	(01203) xxxxxx	(024) 76xx xxxx
Cardiff	(01222) xxxxxx	(029) 20xx xxxx

Note Under the change, the two London areas were reunified under the single (020) code. New numbers beginning with 7, 8 or (later) 3, 4 were allocated regardless of location.

All of the above areas now have an eight-digit local number, in place of their previous six or seven-digit local number. For a short while, you could use either number for local dialling, but local access to the old, shorter numbers was switched off after a few months of parallel running.

Within London, new 70xx xxxx, 71xx xxxx, 80xx xxxx and 81xx xxxx numbers became available for general use. These began to be allocated anywhere in London, with no regard for the 1990-2000 inner/outer London geographical split.

In all of the other areas, new BC0x xxxx and BC1x xxxx numbers became available for general use at the same time (where 'BC' stands for '76' in Coventry, '20' in Cardiff, etc.).

=== Northern Ireland ===
Area	Before BNC	After BNC	Actual county (if different)
County Antrim
Ballycastle	(012657) xxxxx	(028) 207x xxxx	
Martinstown	(012667) xxxxx	(028) 217x xxxx	
Ballymena (5-digit)	(01266) xxxxx	(028) 256x xxxx	
Ballymena (6-digit)	(01266) xxxxxx	(028) 25xx xxxx	
Ballymoney	(012656) xxxxx	(028) 276x xxxx	
Larne	(01574) xxxxxx	(028) 28xx xxxx	
Kilrea	(012665) xxxxx	(028) 295x xxxx	Londonderry
County Armagh
Newry (5-digit)	(01693) xxxxx	(028) 302x xxxx	Partially in Down
Newry (6-digit)	(01693) xxxxxx	(028) 30xx xxxx	Partially in Down
Armagh	(01861) xxxxxx	(028) 37xx xxxx	
Portadown	(01762) xxxxxx	(028) 38xx xxxx	Partially in Down
County Down
Banbridge	(018206) xxxxx	(028) 406x xxxx	
Rostrevor	(016937) xxxxx	(028) 417x xxxx	
Kircubbin	(012477) xxxxx	(028) 427x xxxx	
Newcastle	(013967) xxxxx	(028) 437x xxxx	
Downpatrick	(01396) xxxxxx	(028) 44xx xxxx	
County Fermanagh
Enniskillen	(01365) xxxxxx	(028) 66xx xxxx	
Lisnaskea	(013657) xxxxx	(028) 677x xxxx	
Kesh	(013656) xxxxx	(028) 686x xxxx	
County Londonderry
Coleraine (6-digit)	(01265) xxxxxx	(028) 70xx xxxx	
Coleraine (5-digit)	(01265) xxxxx	(028) 703x xxxx	
Derry	(01504) xxxxxx	(028) 71xx xxxx	
Limavady	(015047) xxxxx	(028) 777x xxxx	
Magherafelt (6-digit)	(01648) xxxxxx	(028) 79xx xxxx	
Magherafelt (5-digit)	(01648) xxxxx	(028) 796x xxxx	
County Tyrone
Carrickmore	(016627) xxxxx	(028) 807x xxxx	
Newtownstewart	(016626) xxxxx	(028) 816x xxxx	
Omagh	(01662) xxxxxx	(028) 82xx xxxx	
Ballygawley	(016625) xxxxx	(028) 855x xxxx	
Cookstown	(016487) xxxxx	(028) 867x xxxx	
Dungannon	(01868) xxxxxx	(028) 87xx xxxx	
Fivemiletown	(013655) xxxxx	(028) 895x xxxx	
Belfast area
Belfast	(01232) xxxxxx	(028) 90xx xxxx	Antrim and Down
Bangor	(01247) xxxxxx	(028) 91xx xxxx	Down
Lisburn	(01846) xxxxxx	(028) 92xx xxxx	Antrim and Down
Ballyclare	(01960) xxxxxx	(028) 93xx xxxx	Antrim
Antrim	(01849) xxxxxx	(028) 94xx xxxx	Antrim
Saintfield	(01238) xxxxxx	(028) 97xx xxxx	Down

In Northern Ireland, the situation was more complicated. While the primary reason for the changes was the lack of numbering capacity in Belfast (01232), this was not the only reason. When STD codes were introduced in the 1950s, Northern Ireland was allocated only 14 area codes for 34 charging groups. Normal practice in Great Britain was to allocate one area code per charging group but, as calls to Northern Ireland were national rate from anywhere in GB, it was not seen to be necessary to differentiate between all of them. So, area codes covering multiple charge groups ("mixed" areas) were created; in practice this meant that some areas had longer area codes. For example, while Enniskillen was allocated the area code 0365 (0EK5), Kesh was allocated 03656 and Lisnaskea 03657. As a result, numbers in Enniskillen could not begin with 6 or 7, as this would conflict with those of Kesh or Lisnaskea.

All this meant that while Enniskillen's numbers could be six digits long, Kesh's and Lisnaskea's (and those of other dependent exchanges) could only be five digits, due to the 9-digit limit of the length of a phone number at the time. This severely restricted capacity in these areas. As a result, at the Big Number Change, all these dependent exchanges were migrated to different numbers than their parent exchanges; in this instance while Enniskillen's 01365 (the 1 coming from PhONEday) was migrated to 028 66, Kesh went from 013656 to 028 686 and Lisnaskea from 013657 to 028 677. This meant that Kesh could expand into the rest of the 028 68xx range.

Note that the new numbering scheme groups numbers together such that the first digit identifies the county in alphabetical order. The exception is the Greater Belfast area where all numbers begin with 9, regardless of the county. The full list of changes for Northern Ireland is as in the table above.

=== National dialling only ranges ===
In London, old National Dialling Only 0xx xxxx and 1xx xxxx numbers were migrated to new 0axx xxxx and 1axx xxxx numbers (where 'a' is mostly 0 or 1, so far).

In all of the other areas, old National Dialling Only 0xxxxx and 1xxxxx numbers were migrated to new 0aax xxxx and 1aax xxxx numbers.

The migration from old to new numbers was as follows:

Area	Old range (Note: These areas had added a '1' to the area code at PhONEday. Previous to that, these codes were 0xxx with six-figure local numbers, except London and parts of NI. London codes were previously 0x1 with seven-figure local numbers. NI codes added a '1' at PhONEday but some areas previously had longer codes than shown, paired with shorter numbers that were often only four or five digits long.)	New range
Coventry	01203 0xxxxx	024 010x xxxx
Coventry	01203 1xxxxx	024 111x xxxx
Cardiff	01222 0xxxxx	029 010x xxxx
Cardiff	01222 1xxxxx	029 111x xxxx
Belfast	01232 0xxxxx	028 010x xxxx
Belfast	01232 1xxxxx	028 101x xxxx
Southampton	01703 0xxxxx	023 010x xxxx
Southampton	01703 1xxxxx	023 111x xxxx
Portsmouth	01705 0xxxxx	023 010x xxxx
Portsmouth	01705 1xxxxx	023 101x xxxx
London	0171-0xx xxxx	020 01xx xxxx
London	0171-1xx xxxx	020 11xx xxxx
London	0181-0xx xxxx	020 00xx xxxx
London	0181-1xx xxxx	020 10xx xxxx

== Non-geographic number changes ==
=== Special services and freephone ===
The following changes were made to non-geographic numbering ranges to bring them in the 08xx special services range.

Code	Charging rate	Before BNC	After BNC
0345	Local rate (BT Lo-Call)	0345 xxxxxx	0845 7xx xxxx
0645	Local rate (Mercury LocalCall)	0645 xxxxxx	0845 9xx xxxx
0374 5	National rate	0374 5xxxxx	0870 45x xxxx
0541 5	National rate (Mercury AreaCall)	0541 5xxxxx	0870 15x xxxx
0990	National rate (BT NationalCall)	0990 xxxxxx	0870 5xx xxxx
0321	Vodafone Freephone	0321 xxxxxx	0808 0xx xxxx
0500	Mercury Freephone	0500 xxxxxx	no change
0800	BT Freephone	0800 xxxxxx	no change

The 0500 (Mercury FreeCall) code remained in use after The Big Number Change, but no new numbers were allocated after 28 April 2001. The 0500 range was eventually ceased on 3 June 2017, with numbers transferred to 0808 5xx xxxx equivalents during a three-year transition period prior to that date.

The 0800 (BT Free phone) code has remained, but no new nine-digit numbers have been allocated since 1997. Instead, all 0800 numbers issued since that time have ten digits after the leading 0 or +44.

=== Premium rate ===
The following changes were made to non-geographic numbering ranges to bring them in the 090x premium rate range.

Code	Charging rate	Before BNC	After BNC
0331	VoData premium rate	0331	Unknown
0336 0	VoData premium rate	0336 0xxxxx	Unknown
0336 1	VoData premium rate	0336 1xxxxx	Unknown
0336 2	VoData premium rate	0336 2xxxxx	Unknown
0336 3	VoData premium rate	0336 3xxxxx	Unknown
0336 4	VoData premium rate	0336 4xxxxx	Unknown
0336 5	VoData premium rate	0336 5xxxxx	Unknown
0336 6	VoData premium rate	0336 6xxxxx	Unknown
0336 8	VoData premium rate	0336 8xxxxx	Unknown
0336 9	VoData premium rate	0336 9xxxxx	Unknown
0338	Mercury premium rate	0338	Unknown
0632	Premium rate	0632 xxxxxx	090x
0640	Mercury premium rate	0640	090x
0660	Mercury premium rate	0660 xxxxxx	090x
0696	Premium rate	0696 xxxxxx	090x
0696 6	Jersey Telecoms premium rate	0696 6xxxxx	090x
0696 8	Manx Telecoms premium rate	0696 8xxxxx	090x
0696 9	Guernsey Telecoms premium rate	0696 9xxxxx	090x
0836	premium rate?	0836	
0839	Mercury premium rate?	0839 xxxxxx	Unknown
0853	Premium rate	0853	090x
0881 1	Mercury premium rate	0881 1xxxxx	090x
0881 2	Mercury premium rate	0881 2xxxxx	090x
0881 3	Mercury premium rate	0881 3xxxxx	090x
0881 5	Mercury premium rate	0881 5xxxxx	090x
0881 6	Mercury premium rate	0881 6xxxxx	090x
0881 7	Mercury premium rate	0881 7xxxxx	090x
0881 9	Mercury premium rate	0881 9xxxxx	090x
0890	Premium rate	0890 xxxxxx	090x
0891	BT ValueCall	0891 xxxxxx	090x
0894	BT premium rate	0894	090x
0895	premium rate?	0895	
0896	Premium rate	0896	090x
0897	BT premium rate	0897	090x
0898	BT premium rate	0898 xxxxxx	090x
0930 0	Premium rate	0930 0xxxxx	090x
0930 1	Premium rate	0930 1xxxxx	090x
0930 2	Premium rate	0930 2xxxxx	090x
0930 3	Premium rate	0930 3xxxxx	090x
0930 4	Premium rate	0930 4xxxxx	090x
0930 5	Premium rate	0930 5xxxxx	090x
0930 6	Premium rate	0930 6xxxxx	090x
0930 8	Premium rate	0930 8xxxxx	090x
0930 9	Premium rate	0930 9xxxxx	090x
0991	Mercury premium rate	0991	090x

== Mobile, pager and personal number changes ==
=== Personal numbers ===
Personal numbers moved to the 070 range.

Code	Charging rate	Before BNC	After BNC
0956 7	FleXtel Personal Numbering	0956 7xxxxx	070 107x xxxx

=== Mobile numbers ===
The following changes were made to mobile phone numbering ranges to bring them in the 07xxx mobile numbers range.

Code	Operator	Before BNC	After BNC
0370	Vodafone	0370 xxxxxx	07770 xxxxxx
0374 0	Vodafone	0374 0xxxxx	07774 0xxxxx
0374 1	Vodafone	0374 1xxxxx	07774 1xxxxx
0374 2	Vodafone	0374 2xxxxx	07774 2xxxxx
0374 3	Vodafone	0374 3xxxxx	07774 3xxxxx
0374 4	Vodafone	0374 4xxxxx	07774 4xxxxx
0374 6	Vodafone	0374 6xxxxx	07774 6xxxxx
0374 7	Vodafone	0374 7xxxxx	07774 7xxxxx
0374 8	Vodafone	0374 8xxxxx	07774 8xxxxx
0374 9	Vodafone	0374 9xxxxx	07774 9xxxxx
0378	Vodafone	0378 xxxxxx	07778 xxxxxx
0385 0	Vodafone	0385 0xxxxx	07785 0xxxxx
0385 1	Vodafone	0385 1xxxxx	07785 1xxxxx
0385 2	Vodafone	0385 2xxxxx	07785 2xxxxx
0385 3	Vodafone	0385 3xxxxx	07785 3xxxxx
0385 5	Vodafone	0385 5xxxxx	07785 5xxxxx
0385 7	Vodafone	0385 7xxxxx	07785 7xxxxx
0385 8	Vodafone	0385 8xxxxx	07785 8xxxxx
0385 9	Vodafone	0385 9xxxxx	07785 9xxxxx
0390	Orange	0390 xxxxxx	07790 xxxxxx
0401	BT Cellnet	0401 xxxxxx	07701 xxxxxx
0402	BT Cellnet	0402 xxxxxx	07702 xxxxxx
0403	BT Cellnet	0403 xxxxxx	07703 xxxxxx
0408	BT Cellnet Personal Assistant	0408 xxxxxx	Discontinued by 28 April 2001
0410	BT Cellnet	0410 xxxxxx	07710 xxxxxx
0411	BT Cellnet	0411 xxxxxx	07711 xxxxxx
0421	Vodafone	0421 xxxxxx	07721 xxxxxx
0441	Vodafone	0441 xxxxxx	07741 xxxxxx
04481	Guernsey Telecom	04481 xxxxxx	07781 xxxxxx
0456 0	Orange	0456 0xxxxx	Unknown
0456 1	Orange	0456 1xxxxx	Unknown
04624	Isle of Man	04624 xxxxxx	07624 xxxxxx
0467	Vodafone	0467 xxxxxx	07767 xxxxxx
0468	Vodafone	0468 xxxxxx	07768 xxxxxx
0498	Vodafone	0498 xxxxxx	07798 xxxxxx
0585	BT Cellnet	0585 xxxxxx	07885 xxxxxx
0589	BT Cellnet	0589 xxxxxx	07889 xxxxxx
0802	BT Cellnet	0802 xxxxxx	07802 xxxxxx
0831	Vodafone	0831 xxxxxx	07831 xxxxxx
0836	Vodafone	0836 xxxxxx	07836 xxxxxx
0839	Vodafone	0839 xxxxxx	07839 xxxxxx
0850	BT Cellnet	0850 xxxxxx	07850 xxxxxx
0860	BT Cellnet	0860 xxxxxx	07860 xxxxxx
0930 7 (0961 7)	One-to-One	0930 7xxxxx (0961 7xxxxx)	07930 7xxxxx
0956 1	One-to-One	0956 1xxxxx	07956 1xxxxx
0956 2	One-to-One	0956 2xxxxx	07956 2xxxxx
0956 3	One-to-One	0956 3xxxxx	07956 3xxxxx
0956 4	One-to-One	0956 4xxxxx	07956 4xxxxx
0956 5	One-to-One	0956 5xxxxx	07956 5xxxxx
0956 6	One-to-One	0956 6xxxxx	07956 6xxxxx
0956 8	One-to-One	0956 8xxxxx	07956 8xxxxx
0956 9	One-to-One	0956 9xxxxx	07956 9xxxxx
0958 0	One-to-One Freephone	0958 0xxxxx	Discontinued by 28 April 2001
0958 1	One-to-One Local Rate	0958 1xxxxx	Discontinued by 28 April 2001
0958 2	One-to-One	0958 2xxxxx	07958 2xxxxx
0958 3	One-to-One	0958 3xxxxx	07958 3xxxxx
0958 4	One-to-One	0958 4xxxxx	07958 4xxxxx
0958 5	One-to-One	0958 5xxxxx	07958 5xxxxx
0958 6	One-to-One	0958 6xxxxx	07958 6xxxxx
0958 7	One-to-One	0958 7xxxxx	07958 7xxxxx
0958 8	One-to-One	0958 8xxxxx	07958 8xxxxx
0958 9	One-to-One	0958 9xxxxx	07958 9xxxxx
0961 0	One-to-One	0961 0xxxxx	07961 0xxxxx
0961 1	One-to-One	0961 1xxxxx	07961 1xxxxx
0961 2	One-to-One	0961 2xxxxx	07961 2xxxxx
0961 3	One-to-One	0961 3xxxxx	07961 3xxxxx
0961 4	One-to-One	0961 4xxxxx	07961 4xxxxx
0961 5	One-to-One	0961 5xxxxx	07961 5xxxxx
0961 6	One-to-One	0961 6xxxxx	07961 6xxxxx
0961 8	One-to-One	0961 8xxxxx	07961 8xxxxx
0961 9	One-to-One	0961 9xxxxx	07961 9xxxxx
0966	Orange	0966 xxxxxx	07966 xxxxxx
0973	Orange	0973 xxxxxx	07973 xxxxxx
0976	Orange	0976 xxxxxx	07976 xxxxxx
0979 7	Jersey Telecom	0979 7xxxxx	07797 7xxxxx

=== Pager numbers ===
The following codes for pager numbers were also changed, so that all are in the 076 range:

Code	Operator	Before BNC	After BNC
0399 0 → 01399 0	VodaPage	0399 0xxxxx → 01399 0xxxxx	Discontinued by 28 April 2001
0399 1 → 01399 1	VodaPage	0399 1xxxxx → 01399 1xxxxx	076 991x xxxx
0399 2 → 01399 2	VodaPage	0399 2xxxxx → 01399 2xxxxx	076 992x xxxx
0399 3 → 01399 3	VodaPage	0399 3xxxxx → 01399 3xxxxx	076 993x xxxx
0399 4 → 01399 4	VodaPage	0399 4xxxxx → 01399 4xxxxx	076 994x xxxx
0399 5 → 01399 5	VodaPage	0399 5xxxxx → 01399 5xxxxx	076 995x xxxx
0399 6 → 01399 6	VodaPage	0399 6xxxxx → 01399 6xxxxx	076 996x xxxx
0399 7 → 01399 7	VodaPage	0399 7xxxxx → 01399 7xxxxx	076 997x xxxx
0399 8 → 01399 8	VodaPage	0399 8xxxxx → 01399 8xxxxx	076 998x xxxx
0399 9 → 01399 9	VodaPage	0399 9xxxxx → 01399 9xxxxx	076 999x xxxx
0426 → 01426	BT Paging	0426 xxxxxx → 01426 xxxxxx	076 26xx xxxx
0459 2→ 01459 2	PageOne/Mercury	0459 2xxxxx → 01459 2xxxxx	076 592x xxxx
0459 3→ 01459 3	VodaPage	0459 3xxxxx → 01459 3xxxxx	076 593x xxxx
0459 4→ 01459 4	VodaPage	0459 4xxxxx → 01459 4xxxxx	076 594x xxxx
0459 5→ 01459 5	VodaPage	0459 5xxxxx → 01459 5xxxxx	076 595x xxxx
0459 6→ 01459 6	VodaPage	0459 6xxxxx → 01459 6xxxxx	076 596x xxxx
0459 8→ 01459 8	VodaPage	0459 8xxxxx → 01459 8xxxxx	076 598x xxxx
0459 9→ 01459 9	PageOne/Mercury	0459 9xxxxx → 01459 9xxxxx	076 599x xxxx
01523	PageOne	01523 xxxxxx	076 23xx xxxx
01893	BT Paging	01893 xxxxxx	076 93xx xxxx
0336 7	Vodafone	0336 7xxxxx	076 637x xxxx
0385 4	Vodata?	0385 4xxxxx	Unknown
0385 6	Vodata	0385 6xxxxx	Unknown
04325	BT Paging	04325 xxxxxx	076 25xx xxxx
04624	Isle of Man?	04624 xxxxxx	076 24xx xxxx
0660 (Note: Page One numbers only. Oftel didn't publish details of PRS migration and asked people to instead refer directly to C&W.)	PageOne	0660 xxxxxx	076 61xx xxxx
0839	PageOne	0839 xxxxxx	076 61xx xxxx
0881 0	PageOne	0881 0xxxxx	076 810x xxxx
0881 4	PageOne	0881 4xxxxx	076 814x xxxx
0881 8	PageOne	0881 8xxxxx	076 818x xxxx
0941	Orange (HPL)	0941 xxxxxx	076 41xx xxxx
0941 1	Orange (HPL)	0941 1xxxxx	076 411x xxxx

Non-standard pager prefixes beginning 01 were moved to their new 076 allocation.

Some of these codes, as indicated by the arrow "→", had already been changed during PhONEday to add a "1" after the initial zero, and now they have been changed again.

== Numbers for drama ==
These fictional numbers were originally made available by Oftel for dramatic purposes; for example, for quoting in TV, radio and film programmes. Ofcom revised the list some years after the Big Number Change, and explained: "Telephone Numbers recommended for drama purposes cannot be allocated to Communications Providers for their customers because of the potential influx of calls that customers may receive should their Telephone Numbers be shown in a drama."

Number range type	Code area	Before PhONEday		Before BNC		After BNC	
Number range type	Code area	Code	Number range	Code	Number range	Code	Number range
Geographic	Leeds			0113	496 0000 to 496 0009	0113	496 0000 to 496 0999
Geographic	Sheffield			0114	496 0000 to 496 0009	0114	496 0000 to 496 0999
Geographic	Nottingham			0115	496 0000 to 496 0009	0115	496 0000 to 496 0999
Geographic	Leicester			0116	496 0000 to 496 0009	0116	496 0000 to 496 0999
Geographic	Bristol			0117	496 0000 to 496 0009	0117	496 0000 to 496 0999
Geographic	Reading			0118	496 0000 to 496 0009	0118	496 0000 to 496 0999
Geographic	Birmingham	021	496 0000 to 496 0009	0121	496 0000 to 496 0009	0121	496 0000 to 496 0999
Geographic	Edinburgh	031	496 0000 to 496 0009	0131	496 0000 to 496 0009	0131	496 0000 to 496 0999
Geographic	Glasgow	041	496 0000 to 496 0009	0141	496 0000 to 496 0009	0141	496 0000 to 496 0999
Geographic	Liverpool	051	496 0000 to 496 0009	0151	496 0000 to 496 0009	0151	496 0000 to 496 0999
Geographic	Manchester	061	496 0000 to 496 0009	0161	496 0000 to 496 0009	0161	496 0000 to 496 0999
Geographic	Tyneside/Durham/Wearside	091	498 0000 to 498 0009	0191	498 0000 to 498 0009	0191	498 0000 to 498 0999
Geographic	London	071	946 0000 to 946 0009	0171	946 0000 to 946 0009	020	7946 0000 to 7946 0999
Geographic	Northern Ireland					028	9018 0000 to 9018 0999
Geographic	Cardiff					029	2018 0000 to 2018 0999
Geographic	No area	0632	960000 to 960009	01632	960000 to 960009	01632	960000 to 960999
Mobile	n/a			07700	900000 to 900009	07700	900000 to 900999
UK-wide	n/a					0306	999 0000 to 999 0999
Freephone	n/a			0808	157 0980 to 157 0989	0808	157 0000 to 157 0999
Premium rate services	n/a			0909	879 0980 to 879 0989	0909	879 0000 to 879 0999

Although not directly connected with the official Big Number changes, these number allocations were updated with the new prefixes and with additional areas, as well as changing from 10 to 1000 numbers allocated per block, around the same time as the other Big Number changes occurred.

== Misunderstandings ==
Some widespread misunderstandings about area codes came about with the Big Number Change, most notably with London area codes. There is a widespread but erroneous assumption that London has several area codes – 0203, 0204, 0207 and 0208 – whereas, in fact, it has just one: 020. Similar misunderstandings came about with a few other area codes.

== See also ==
- Telephone numbers in the United Kingdom
- List of dialling codes in the United Kingdom
- List of Wales dialling codes
- UK telephone code misconceptions—includes the common "0207" and "0208" misconceptions
