= 0191 =

British dialling code

United Kingdom area code for Newcastle upon Tyne/Tyneside/Durham/Sunderland
- National calling: 0191
- International calling: +44 191
- Conservation: No
- Active since: 16 April 1995
- Previous code(s): 091
- Earlier code(s): 0385, 0632, 0783, 0894
- Number format: 0191 xxx xxxx

Coverage
- Area served: Chester-le-Street; Durham; Seaham; Peterlee; Sunderland; Newcastle upon Tyne

0191 is the UK telephone dialling code used by Newcastle upon Tyne, Durham, Sunderland and other nearby areas in the north east of England.

== Areas covered ==
Numbering in the 0191 area is officially divided into three distinct areas, each with their own batches of local subscriber numbers:

Number range	Official designation	Notes
0191 2xx xxxx	Tyneside	Mainly North Tyneside, Newcastle upon Tyne and parts of southern Northumberland that border northern Tyneside.
0191 3xx xxxx	Durham	Also Chester-le-Street
0191 4xx xxxx	Tyneside	Originally exclusive to South Tyneside, Washington, Gateshead.
0191 5xx xxxx	Sunderland	Also East Durham.
0191 6xx xxxx	Tyneside	Primarily VOIP, virtual operators and overflow from 2xx xxxx range for Newcastle city centre.
0191 7xx xxxx	Sunderland	Extra capacity assigned in 2010, following consultation.
0191 8xx xxxx	Tyneside	Extra capacity assigned in 2010, following consultation.
0191 9xx xxxx	Durham	Extra capacity assigned in 2010, following consultation.

In practice, some of the distinction between these areas has been lost due to differing levels of demand in each area and the need to find sufficient blocks of numbers for the many competing telephone companies that now exist. In particular, the original distinction between north Tyneside (2xx xxxx) and south Tyneside (4xx xxxx) has been obscured as the former range reached full capacity and recent allocations north of the Tyne have made use of spare capacity in the 4xx xxxx range. Further anomalies include Durham prefixes such as (0191) 350 being used by Cable & Wireless in Newcastle city centre and (0191) 275 being used by BT in South Shields, an area traditionally (0191) 4XX. New connections with Talk Talk have the prefix 447 or 340 no matter where in the 0191 area they reside and all new Sky telephone lines have the prefix 659, 660, 670 or 711 within the 0191 area, regardless of location.

Local dialling omitting the area code and using only the seven digit subscriber number is possible throughout the area, regardless of location or service provider.

=== 2010 Numbering Consultation ===
The release of local numbers starting 7, 8 and 9 followed consultation by Ofcom, in which the regulator stated its plans to issue remaining unused numbers in the 0191 area code in a way that preserves three distinct geographical groupings. Ofcom's initial proposal included allocating the 7xx xxxx range to Tyneside and the 8xx xxxx range to Sunderland. These assignments were reversed following consultation feedback from individuals and BT.

== History of the code ==
The original 091 area code was introduced in 1982 and phased in over a period of approximately five years. It was the newest two-figure STD code since the STD system was introduced into the UK, prior to London being split into two STD codes (071 and 081). It was later changed to 0191 as a part of PhONEday. Although it had no letter mnemonic officially ascribed to the 9 (due to the code being introduced years after All Figure Dialling, which saw existing letter mnemonics being converted to their corresponding numbers), it was believed that the number was chosen because it could stand for the 'Y' in Tyneside or the 'W' in Wear, despite the code also being used in Durham, which previously used 0DU5 (0385).

0632	→	Became (091) 2 and (091) 4
0385	→	Became (091) 3
0894	→	Became (091) 4
0783	→	Became (091) 5

The first area to be converted was Newcastle upon Tyne (0632) and the change over took about 20 months starting in 1982. Newcastle City Centre five-digit numbers in 0632 all began with 2, so 18 months before the scheme started, their numbers were prefixed with 3; that would allow the number 2 to be utilised for the North Tyne numbering part of the scheme. The first exchanges to convert to 7-digit dialling were Blaydon, Birtley, and Washington. Their local 6-digit numbers already began with 4 and were situated south of the River Tyne; to alleviate misdialling and confusion they were the first localities to convert. The main problem was that Blaydon numbers already began with 44 so misdialling in that exchange was inevitable.

To prevent misdialling between (0632) 44XXXX and (091) 444 XXXX, a plan was devised to change all South Tyne numbers beginning with the digit 4 to 7 digits by inserting 1 between the first two digits, making them (091) 41X XXXX instead. No similar problems occurred in North Tyneside as number 2 was no longer in use, 5 was not in use in Sunderland, and 3 was never used in Durham. Local numbers were changed as follows: from Birtley 40 to 410, Blaydon 44 to 414 and Washington 46 to 416. At the same time, Ryton, the only exchange in the Newcastle area with 4-figure numbers, was prefixed with 413. Ryton was still utilising the old 089,422 code for Newcastle Ring until its conversion to 091. Ryton was never upgraded to 0632 prior to seven-digit dialling.

All other numbers were prefixed with 2 north of the River Tyne and 4 south of it. Sunderland followed with the prefix 5 after the Tyneside scheme was completed, and Durham, again shortly after, with 3. Unlike Tyneside, whose changeover occurred in stages, the entire Durham and the entire Sunderland changeover occurred simultaneously overnight.

Five-digit numbers in Sunderland were prefixed with 51 or 56; e.g., Sunderland (0783) 72000 became (091) 567 2000, and (0783) 43077 became (091) 514 3077.

Five-digit numbers in Durham were prefixed with 38; e.g., Durham (0385) 64411 became (091) 386 4411.
