= Telephone numbers in the United Kingdom =

Telephone numbers in United Kingdom
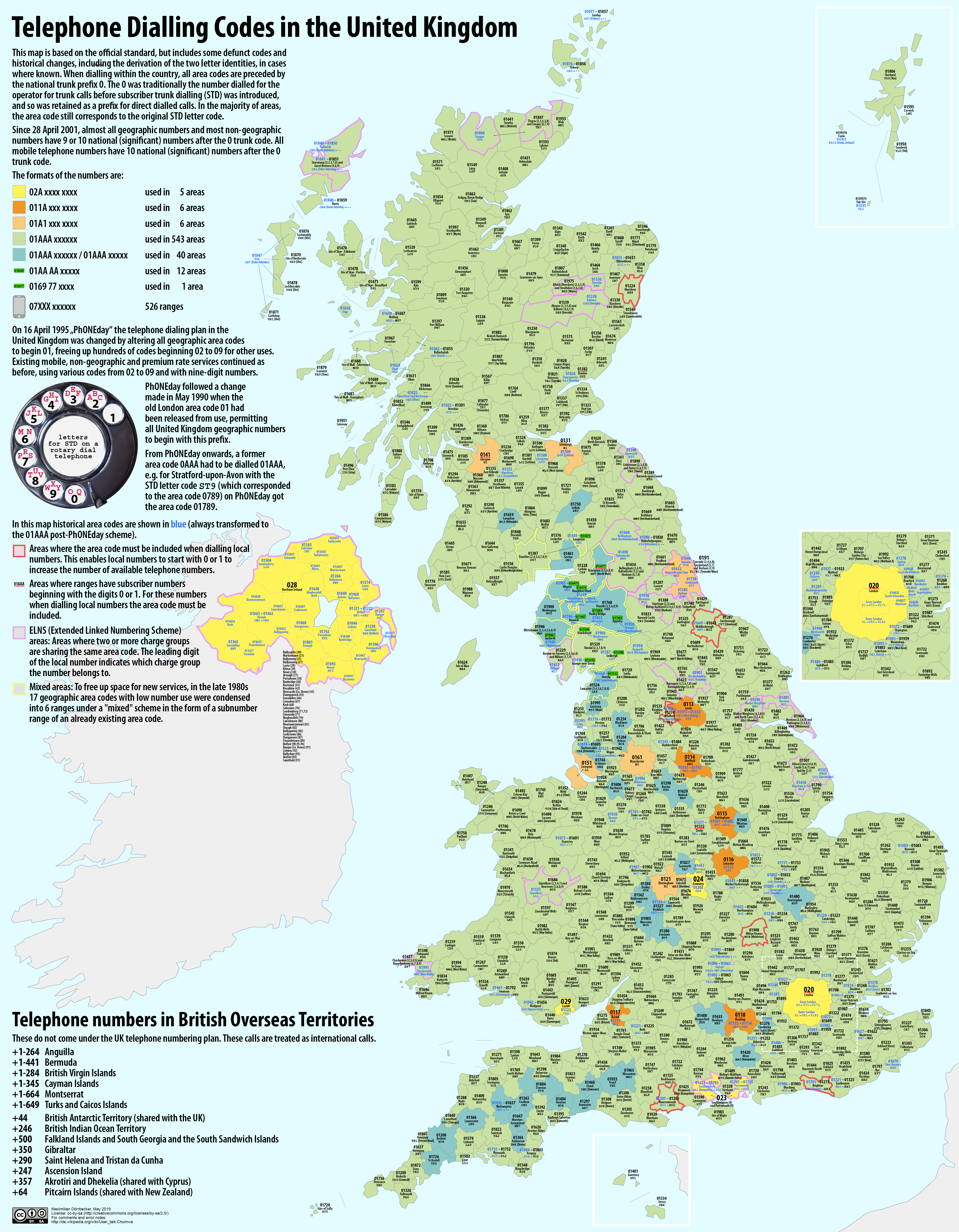
- Telephone Dialling Codes in the United Kingdom
- Country: United Kingdom
- Continent: Europe
- Regulator: Ofcom
- Numbering plan type: Open
- NSN length: 7, 9, 10 (Note: 7 for two special 08xx numbers; 9 in some 01xxx areas, one 01xxxx area, all 0500 numbers, and some 0800 numbers; 10 in all other areas and mobile phones)
- Format: various, see text
- Numbering plan: The National Telephone Numbering Plan
- Last updated: 18 September 2010
- Country code: 44
- International access: 00
- Long-distance: 0

In the United Kingdom and the Crown Dependencies, telephone numbers are administered by the Office of Communications (Ofcom). For this purpose, Ofcom established a telephone numbering plan, known as the National Telephone Numbering Plan, which is the system for assigning telephone numbers to subscriber stations.

Telephone numbers are of variable length. Local numbers are supported from landlines. Numbers can be dialled with a '0'-lead prefix that denotes either a geographical region or another service. Mobile phone numbers have distinct prefixes that are not geographic, and are portable between providers.

== Structure ==
All mobile numbers, nearly all geographic numbers, and nearly all non-geographic numbers have ten national (significant) digits after the trunk code 0. The overall structure of the UK's National Numbering Plan is:

Prefix	Service type
00	International
01	Geographic area codes
02	Geographic area codes (introduced in 2000).
03	Non-geographic numbers charged at standard geographic area code rates (introduced in 2007)
04	Not in use
05	Corporate numbering and VoIP services; freephone services (0500) until June 2017
06	Not in use
07	Mobile telephony (071xx–075xx, 07624 and 077xx–079xx), personal numbering (070xx), and pagers (076xx)
08	Non-geographic freephone numbers (080x), non-geographic service numbers (084x and 087x)
09	Non-geographic service numbers

A short sample of geographic numbers, set out in the officially approved (Ofcom) number groups:

Number	Location
(020) xxxx xxxx	London
(029) xxxx xxxx	Cardiff
(0113) xxx xxxx	Leeds
(0116) xxx xxxx	Leicester
(0121) xxx xxxx	Birmingham
(0151) xxx xxxx	Liverpool
(01382) xxxxxx	Dundee
(01386) xxxxxx	Evesham
(01865) xxxxxx	Oxford
(01204) xxxxx	Bolton
(015396) xxxxx	Sedbergh
(016977) xxxx or (016977) xxxxx	Brampton

In the United Kingdom, the "area code" was historically referred to as a "subscriber trunk dialling code" (STD code) or a "dialling code". United Kingdom area codes are two, three, four or, exceptionally, five digits long (after the initial zero). Regions with shorter area codes, typically large cities, permit the allocation of more telephone numbers as the local number part has more digits. Local customer numbers are four to eight digits long. The total number of digits is ten or, very rarely, nine.

The code allocated to the largest population is (020) for London. The code allocated to the largest area is (028) for all of Northern Ireland. The UK Numbering Plan also applies to three British Crown dependencies – Guernsey, Jersey, and the Isle of Man – even though they are not part of the UK, these countries are closely related.

== Format ==
Possible number formats for UK telephone numbers are:

Number length	10-digit NSN	9-digit NSN	7-digit NSN	6 digits	5 digits	4 digits	3 digits
Number formats	(01xx xx) xx xxx (01xxx) xxx xxx (01x1) xxx xxxx (011x) xxx xxxx (02x) xxxx xxxx 03xx xxx xxxx 055 xxxx xxxx 056 xxxx xxxx 07x xxxx xxxx 07xxx xxx xxx 0800 xxx xxxx 08xx xxx xxxx 09xx xxx xxxx	(01xx xx) xxxx (01xxx) xx xxx 0800 xxx xxx	0800 11 11; 0845 46 4x	118 xxx 116 xxx	17070	1470; 1471; 1472; 1474; 1475; 1476; 1477; 1478; 1479; 1571; 1572	999; 112; 100; 101; 105; 111; 119; 123; 141; 155; 159 195

Number ranges starting 01 can have National Significant Number (NSN) length of 10 or (very rarely) 9 digits. NSN is the number of digits after the leading 0 trunk code or +44 international prefix. The 0800 range can have NSN length as 10, 9, or 7 digits. The 0845 range can have NSN length as 10 or 7 digits. The 0500 range had NSN length as 9 digits only, and was withdrawn from use on 3 June 2017. All other UK numbers have NSN length of 10 digits. There are no telephone numbers in the UK with an NSN length of 8 digits.

== Geographic numbers ==
=== Standard geographic numbers ===
Geographic telephone numbers in the UK always have nine or ten digits after the 0 trunk code or +44 international dialling prefix.

==== Four-digit area codes ====
Four-digit area codes have either six-digit subscriber numbers or a mix of five- and six-digit subscriber numbers.

- (01xxx) xxx xxx

This is the format used by most areas. It has a four-digit area code (after the initial zero) and a six digit subscriber number, and is known as 4+6 format. These area codes were changed by adding a "1" directly after the initial zero as a part of PhONEday in 1995. Just short of 581 areas use this format, and the area codes range from 01200 to 01998. Almost all (01xxx) area codes now have only six-digit subscriber numbers, but a small number of these areas also have some subscriber numbers that are only five digits in length (see next section).

01224	Aberdeen	22 = AB	
01244	Chester	24 = CH	
01275	Clevedon	27 = BR	
01382	Dundee	38 = DU	
01387	Dumfries (mixed)	38 = DU	Local numbers cannot begin with 3
01452	Gloucester	45 = GL	
01472	Grimsby	47 = GR	
01473	Ipswich	47 = IP	
01429	Hartlepool	42 = HA	
01482	Hull	48 = HU	
01539	Kendal (mixed)	53 = KE	Local numbers cannot begin with 4, 5 or 6
01582	Luton	58 = LU	
01642	Teesside or Middlesbrough	64 = MI	
01670	Morpeth	67 = MP	
01697	Brampton, North West (mixed)	69 = NW	Local numbers cannot begin with 3, 4 or 7
01733	Peterborough	73 = PE	
01736	Penzance	73 = PE	
01772	Preston	77 = PR	
01782	Stoke-on-Trent	78 = ST	
01792	Swansea	79 = SW	
01793	Swindon	79 = SW	
01854	Ullapool	85 = UL	
01947	Whitby	94 = WH	

Six of the four-digit area codes are known as "mixed" areas as they share those four digits with the twelve five-digit area codes. This leads to a restriction as to which initial digits can be used for subscriber numbers within those four-digit area codes, e.g. in the 01387 four-digit area code, subscriber numbers cannot begin with a 3 because 013873 is a separate five-digit area code; likewise in the 01946 four-digit area code, subscriber numbers cannot begin with a 7 because 019467 is a separate five-digit area code.

- (01xxx) xx xxx

This is used for forty smaller towns which have a mixture of six and five digit local numbers, each type allocated in specific DE blocks*; e.g. in the 01647 area code numbers beginning 24 and 61 have five digits (24xxx and 61xxx; known as 4+5 format) whereas all other DE blocks* within that area code have six digit numbers. The number of places with five digit subscriber numbers and an 01xxx area code has declined rapidly in recent decades. There were 511 ranges allocated across 56 different area codes in January 1998. The Big Number Change removed many, especially in Northern Ireland, and by July 2005 there were only 329 ranges in 42 codes. By April 2010 this had reduced to 324 ranges in 40 codes, with still the same number in November 2012. The 40 area codes are listed in the table below.

*A DE block is a block of numbers where (taking the area code and the subscriber number together) the initial 0 and the next six digits after it are the same for all the subscriber numbers in the block.

(These area codes, like many others, were changed by adding a "1" directly after the initial zero as a part of PhONEday in 1995.)

01204	Bolton	20 = BO	61–64	
01208	Bodmin	20 = BO	72–79	
01254	Blackburn	25 = BL	51–57, 59	
01276	Camberley	27 = CR	20–29, 31–38, 61–66	
01297	Axminster	29 = AX	20–24, 32–35	
01298	Buxton	29 = BX	22–28, 70–74, 77–79, 83–85	
01363	Crediton	36 = CN	82–85	
01364	Ashburton, Devon	36 = DN	72, 73	
01384	Dudley	38 = DU	70, 74–79	
01386	Evesham	38 = EV	40, 41, 45, 47–49	
01404	Honiton	40 = HO	41–47	
01420	Alton, Hampshire	42 = HA	22, 23, 80–89	
01460	Chard, Ilminster	46 = IM	30, 52–55, 57, 61–68, 72–78	
01461	Gretna	46 = GN	40	
01480	Huntingdon	48 = HU	52	
01488	Hungerford	48 = HU	71–73	
01524	Lancaster (mixed)	52 = LA	32–37, 39, 60–69	Local numbers cannot begin with 2
01527	Redditch		60–69	
01562	Kidderminster	56 = KM	60, 66–69	
01566	Launceston	56 = LN	86	
01595	Lerwick	56 = LW	86	
01606	Northwich, Winsford	60 = NO	40–49, 74–77, 79	
01629	Matlock	62 = MA	55–57	
01635	Newbury	63 = NE	30–39, 40–49	
01647	Moretonhampstead	64 = MH	24, 61	
01659	Sanquhar, Nithsdale	65 = NL	50, 58, 66, 67, 74	
01695	Skelmersdale/Ormskirk		50–54	
01726	St Austell	72 = SA	61, 63–69, 70–77	
01744	St Helens	74 = SH	20–29	
01750	Selkirk	75 = SK	20–23, 32, 42, 52, 62, 76, 82	
01768	Penrith (mixed)	76 = PN	882, 883, 884, 886, 887, 888	Local numbers cannot begin with 3, 4 or 7
01827	Tamworth	82 = TA	50–59, 60–69	
01837	Okehampton		52–55, 82, 83, 89	
01884	Tiverton	88 = TV	32–35, 38	
01900	Workington	90 = WO	61–68, 85	
01905	Worcester	90 = WO	20–29	
01935	Yeovil	93 = YE	83	
01946	Whitehaven (mixed)	94 = WH	61–68	Local numbers cannot begin with 7
01949	Whatton	94 = WH	20, 21, 81	
01963	Wincanton	96 = WN	23, 31–34	
01995	Garstang, Wyre	99 = WY	61	

==== Three-digit area codes ====
Three-digit area codes are generally used for the UK's largest cities and conurbations (with the exception of London) and always have seven-digit subscriber numbers and always begin 011x or 01x1.

- (01x1) xxx xxxx

This is the geographic number format for the first round of five large cities moved to all figure dialling in the 1960s, and subsequently also used in the metropolitan county of Tyne and Wear, eastern County Durham and south-eastern Northumberland from the 1980s onwards. These six areas have a three-digit area code matching the pattern 1x1 (after the initial zero) and a seven digit subscriber number, and this is known as 3+7 format. These area codes were changed by adding a "1" directly after the initial zero as a part of PhONEday in 1995.

Code	Geographical area	Former code(s)
0121	Birmingham	021 (2 = B)
0131	Edinburgh	031 (3 = E)
0141	Glasgow	041 (4 = G)
0151	Liverpool	051 (5 = L)
0161	Manchester	061 (6 = M)
0171	Used for Inner London from 1990 until 2000	
0181	Used for Outer London from 1990 until 2000	
0191	County of Tyne and Wear; Eastern County Durham; South-eastern Northumberland	091 (9 = tYne). Before 1982: 0385 (Durham; 38 = DU); 0632 (North Tyneside/Newcastle; 63 = NE); 0783 (Sunderland; 78 = SU); 0894 (South Tyneside; 89 = TY).

- (011x) xxx xxxx

This is the geographic number format for the second round of large cities and towns moved to brand-new three-digit area codes. Five of these were moved in 1995 as a part of PhONEday, with Reading then following a year later. At the time of the change, an extra digit was added to the subscriber number. These six areas have a three-digit area code matching the pattern 11x, with a seven-digit subscriber number, and this is known as 3+7 format. The first three digits of the local number identifies a small area within the town or city. The former Reading area code had already been changed once, by adding a "1" directly after the initial zero as a part of PhONEday in 1995.

Code	Geographical area	Former code(s)
0113	Leeds	0532 (53 = LE)
0114	Sheffield	0742 (74 = SH)
0115	Nottingham	0602 (60 = NO)
0116	Leicester	0533 (53 = LE)
0117	Bristol	0272 (27 = BR)
0118	Reading	0734, then 01734 (73 = RE)

==== Two-digit area codes ====
Two-digit area codes always have eight-digit subscriber numbers and always begin 02.

- (02x) xxxx xxxx

This is the newest geographic number format. It is used for the third round of changes for large cities and for Northern Ireland, and was formed as a part of the Big Number Change in 2000. The new area code is much shorter than the old one, and begins 02 unlike the previous 01 area codes. Numbers consist of a two-digit area code matching the pattern 02x, and an eight-digit subscriber number, and this is known as 2+8 format. Numbers in these five areas are commonly misquoted, e.g. London incorrectly as 0207 or Cardiff incorrectly as 02920.

The first four digits of the local number identifies a small area within the town, city or region. At the time of the change, the subscriber part of the number gained an extra digit in London, those in Northern Ireland gained two or three digits, and the subscriber part of the number in the other areas gained two digits. All of these areas were also subject to a previous code change, one that added a "1" directly after the initial zero as a part of PhONEday in 1995.

	Location	Number	Formerly
020	London	(020) 3xxx xxxx	New since 2005
020	London	(020) 4xxx xxxx	New since 2019
020	London	(020) 7xxx xxxx	0171 (1995–2000); 071 (1990–1995); 01 (1960s–1990)
020	London	(020) 8xxx xxxx	0181 (1995–2000); 081 (1990–1995); 01 (1960s–1990)
023	Southampton	(023) 8xxx xxxx	01703 (70 = SO)
023	Portsmouth	(023) 9xxx xxxx	01705 (70 = PO)
024	Coventry	(024) 7xxx xxxx	01203 (20 = CO)
028	Northern Ireland	(028) 25xx xxxx Ballymena	(01266) xxx xxx
028	Northern Ireland	(028) 28xx xxxx Larne	(01574) xxx xxx
028	Northern Ireland	(028) 37xx xxxx Armagh	(01861) xxx xxx
028	Northern Ireland	(028) 30xx xxxx Newry	New number range
028	Northern Ireland	(028) 71xx xxxx Derry	(01504) xxx xxx
028	Northern Ireland	(028) 82xx xxxx Omagh	(01662) xxx xxx
028	Northern Ireland	(028) 90xx xxxx Belfast	(01232) xxx xxx
028	Northern Ireland	(028) 91xx xxxx Bangor	(01247) xxx xxx
028	Northern Ireland	(028) 92xx xxxx Lisburn	(01846) xxx xxx
028	Northern Ireland	(028) 95xx xxxx Belfast	New number range
028	Northern Ireland	(028) 97xx xxxx Ballynahinch	(01238) xxx xxx
029	Cardiff	(029) 2xxx xxxx	01222 (22 = CA)

==== Five-digit area codes ====
Five-digit area codes have either five-digit subscriber numbers or a mix of four- and five-digit subscriber numbers. Five-digit area codes always share their first four digits with four-digit area codes.

- (01xx xx) xx xxx and (01xx xx) xxxx

This is the oldest geographic number format and is used for twelve smaller towns and villages where the subscriber number is either five or (in one area code) four digits long. These are known as 5+5 and 5+4 format. Therefore, the STD code and the subscriber number does not always total ten digits after the initial zero trunk code. These area codes were changed by adding a "1" directly after the initial zero as a part of PhONEday in 1995. The number of places using these two formats has declined rapidly in recent decades and Brampton is the last place in the UK with four-digit local numbers.

0138 73	Langholm
0152 42	Hornby
0153 94	Hawkshead
0153 95	Grange-over-Sands
0153 96	Sedbergh
0169 73	Wigton
0169 74	Raughton Head
0169 77	Brampton
0176 83	Appleby
0176 84	Pooley Bridge
0176 87	Keswick
0194 67	Gosforth

The above twelve area codes and their six 'parent' area codes (01387, 01524, 01539, 01697, 01768 and 01946) are known as 'Mixed' areas due to multiple area codes sharing the same SABC digits (i.e. the initial zero and the following four digits).

=== National-dialling-only ranges ===
These ranges have subscriber numbers beginning with the digits "0" or "1", e.g.:

0169 77 0xxxx	Brampton
01332 050 xxx	Derby
01382 006 xxx	Dundee
0141 005 xxxx	Glasgow
0117 101 xxxx	Bristol
0118 00x xxxx	Reading
020 0003 xxxx	London

Currently, these numbers are mostly used as the termination points for non-geographic numbers, and by some automated systems such as alarms. As such they are not usually meant to be directly dialled. Using these numbers directly has been problematic as some mobile phone operators in the UK do not allow access to these ranges, and there may also be difficulty accessing these numbers from outside the UK.

Regulator Ofcom proposes that in future these ranges be released for wider, general-purpose use in up to 70 area codes facing number shortage but then, in order to avoid confusion with codes beginning with these digits, the area code would always have to be dialled for all calls, even from within the same geographic exchange. Accordingly, if these numbers are eventually released for general use, Ofcom proposes completely removing the ability to dial locally without the area code in areas affected.

Requiring the use of the area code also allows additional local numbers starting with normally protected Special Services numbers (such as 999, 101, 111, 112 etc.) to be used, significantly increasing the quantity of numbers available for use. This occurred on 1 November 2012 for the 01202 area code, which covers the Bournemouth area.

Recently, the carrier TalkTalk have inadvertently released parts of the 020 0011 range to the general public, with these numbers currently being in use. For example, the charity Give a Car used the number 020 0011 1664 for a while, but recently switched to a proper London number.

== Mobile telephones ==
- 07xxx xxx xxx—mobile phones and WiFi numbers.

Individual mobile phone companies are allocated different ranges within the 071xx, 073xx, 074xx, 075xx, 07624, 077xx, 078xx and 079xx prefixes. Changes to mobile phone numbers in the Big Number Change were mostly straight replacements, such as Vodafone customers on the 0378 block became 07778.

071xx xxx xxx	Mobile phones (in use since January 2017)
073xx xxx xxx	Mobile phones (in use since November 2014)
074xx xxx xxx	Mobile phones (in use since November 2009)
075xx xxx xxx	Mobile phones (in use since May 2007)
076xx xxx xxx	Mobile phones on the Isle of Man
077xx xxx xxx	Mobile phones (former 03xx and 04xx—mostly Vodafone and O2 (formerly Cellnet))
078xx xxx xxx	Mobile phones (former 05xx, 06xx and 08xx—mostly Vodafone and O2 (formerly Cellnet))
079xx xxx xxx	Mobile phones (former 09xx—mostly EE (formerly Orange and one2one/T-Mobile UK))
07911 2xx xxx 07911 8xx xxx	Number range for data-only services (e.g. 3G/LTE-enabled tablet computers, portable modem routers, data devices, etc.)

Since the advent of mobile number portability, mobile phone number prefixes can no longer be relied on to determine the current operator of a particular mobile phone – only the original operator.

== Pagers and personal numbering ==
- 07x xxxx xxxx—pagers and personal numbering (PNS).

070 xxxx xxxx	Personal numbering
076 xxxx xxxx	Pagers (excluding 07624, used for mobile phones on the Isle of Man)

Personal numbers beginning 070 are regulated by Phone-paid Services Authority.

Calls to 070 and 076 numbers are often charged at a much higher rate than the similar-looking 07xxx mobile telephone numbers and often they are not included in "inclusive minutes" in phone contracts.

From 1 October 2019, Ofcom has capped the termination or wholesale rate for calls to 070 numbers to be at the same level as for calls to mobile numbers. Ofcom "expect[s] this will allow phone companies to price calls to these numbers or include them in call allowances in the same way that they do for calls to mobile [number]s".

== Non-geographic numbers ==
=== Non-geographic numbers charged at geographic rate ===
- 03xx xxx xxxx—"UK-wide" numbering.

03xx is a range of non-geographic numbers introduced in 2007 as a cheaper alternative to the shared-cost non-geographic numbers (such as 0870 or 0845 numbers). In contrast to the 084x/087x range, calls to 03 numbers are considered local calls for billing purposes (i.e., like calls to a geographic number 01 or 02). This means that customers who are benefiting from inclusive minutes on mobile phone or landline calling plans are also able to call these numbers using their inclusive minutes.

There are four different ranges of numbers: those beginning 030x are reserved for qualifying public bodies and non-profit organisations; those beginning 033x can be allocated to anyone; and those beginning 034x and 037x have been allocated for migration from the matching 084x and 087x number ranges respectively.

030x xxx xxxx	For qualifying public bodies and non-profit organisations as defined by Ofcom
033x xxx xxxx	For any end user
034x xxx xxxx	Migration range for operators who have 084x numbers
037x xxx xxxx	Migration range for operators who have 087x numbers

=== Corporate and VoIP numbering ===
- 05x xxxx xxxx—Corporate and VoIP numbering.

Unlike 03 numbers there is no uniform pricing for 05 numbers; BT charge a number of different rates depending on the number dialled. Some are charged at geographic rate, others not. Other operators are not required to charge the same rates as BT for calling 05 numbers.

055 xxxx xxxx	Corporate Numbering (but also used by BT for its Broadband Voice service)
056 xxxx xxxx	Allocated by Ofcom for LIECS (Location Independent Electronic Communications Services), e.g. VoIP services

=== Freephone numbers ===
- 0500 xxx xxx—Freephone services allocated before 1999.

Until July 2017, the 0500 range was used for some freephone services which were originally provided by Mercury Communications Ltd (now Cable & Wireless Worldwide). These numbers were different from the rest of the 05 range in that they are only 9 digits in length after the 0 trunk code, e.g. 0500 007 007 (National Savings and Investments), 0500 2 88 2 91 (BBC Radio 2, 88 to 91 FM), 0500 600 600 (Crimewatch), 0500 600 700 (Watchdog) and 0500 909 693 (BBC Radio 5 Live, 909 and 693 kHz). Numerous universities, government departments, airlines, banks and businesses also used these numbers. They were allocated before the general trend of using longer numbers started in 1997 and long before the rest of the 05 range was assigned to corporate and VoIP numbering after 2000.

0500 xxx xxx (Note: Older pre-PhONEday nine-digit 0500 numbers were left as nine-digit numbers after PhONEday. No new 0500 number ranges were released after PhONEday.)	Special Services – No charge to Customer a.k.a. "Freephone"	Free to call from landline, up to 40p per minute from mobile.

The range was withdrawn by Ofcom in July 2017 as a result of a series of consultations starting from 2012. The number range 08085 xxx xxx was made available to owners of 0500 xxx xxx to enable a smooth transition.

- 0800 xxx xxx, 0800 xxx xxxx and 0808 xxx xxxx—Freephone services.

0800 xxx xxx (Note: Older pre-PhONEday nine-digit 0800 numbers were left as nine-digit numbers after PhONEday. All new 0800 number ranges released after PhONEday have ten digits after the 0 trunk code.)	Special Services – No charge to Customer a.k.a. "Freephone"	Free to call from landline, and was up to 40p per minute from mobile, until July 2015 when calls to 080 numbers from mobiles became free. Calls to certain charity and similar services were always free from most mobiles. 0808 9xx xxxx numbers are used by freephone internet services.
0800 xxx xxxx	Special Services – No charge to Customer a.k.a. "Freephone"	Free to call from landline, and was up to 40p per minute from mobile, until July 2015 when calls to 080 numbers from mobiles became free. Calls to certain charity and similar services were always free from most mobiles. 0808 9xx xxxx numbers are used by freephone internet services.
0808 xxx xxxx	Special Services – No charge to Customer a.k.a. "Freephone"	Free to call from landline, and was up to 40p per minute from mobile, until July 2015 when calls to 080 numbers from mobiles became free. Calls to certain charity and similar services were always free from most mobiles. 0808 9xx xxxx numbers are used by freephone internet services.

There is one short "special" number in this range, 0800 11 11 for Childline.

Additionally, numbers in the range 0808 80x xxxx are reserved for not-for-profit helplines and as such are usually free to call from most mobile telephones. Many other numbers can also be called for free from mobiles, but this varies by network.

=== Fixed-rate or special-rate services ===
- 084x xxx xxxx (Special Services basic rate) – non-geographic fixed-rate or special-rate services
- 087x xxx xxxx (Special Services higher rate) – non-geographic fixed-rate or special-rate services.

With the exception of 080x freephone numbers, 08xx numbers are charged above geographic rates, with some of the extra revenue going to the terminating telco. This additional revenue may be shared with the subscriber, but is often used instead to subsidise additional network services, such as fax-to-email, virtual office applications, call queuing, voicemail and easy number redirection. None of these call management services is exclusive to 08xx numbers and they could be provided on any number range.

Special Services basic rate range
0842 xxx xxxx	Up to 4.26p a minute (plus VAT), but fixed (e.g. always 3p/minute or always 4p/minute) from BT landline, other providers may charge more; up to 42p a minute from mobiles.
0843 xxx xxxx	Up to 4.26p a minute (plus VAT), but fixed (e.g. always 3p/minute or always 4p/minute) from BT landline, other providers may charge more; up to 42p a minute from mobiles.
0844 00x xxxx	Non-BT Discount Scheme—Internet Services incorporating unmetered access up to and including 5p for BT customers
0844 01x xxxx to 0844 09x xxxx	Currently unused
0844 1xx xxxx	Currently unused
0844 2xx xxxx to 0844 9xx xxxx	Up to 4.26p a minute (plus VAT), varies daytime/evening/weekend, from BT landline, other providers may charge more; up to 42p a minute from mobiles.
0845 xxx xxxx	Up to 5p a minute, varies daytime/evening/weekend, from BT landline, other providers may charge more; up to 42p a minute from mobiles.

There were a few short "special" numbers in this range, such as 0845 46 47 for NHS Direct; this was closed in 2014 (2015 in Wales) and replaced by NHS 111.

Special Services higher rate range
0870 xxx xxxx	Up to 8p a minute (plus VAT), varies daytime/evening/weekend (charged at no more than the caller would pay for a call to a Geographic Number) from landline; up to 42p a minute from mobiles.
0871 0xx xxxx	Internet Services metered access, up to and including 10p/minute for BT customers.
0871 1xx xxxx	currently unused
0871 2xx xxxx to 0871 9xx xxxx	Up to 8.5p a minute (plus VAT) but fixed (e.g. always 6p/minute or always 8.5p/minute) from BT landline, other providers may charge more; up to 50p a minute from mobiles.
0872 xxx xxxx	Up to 8.5p a minute (plus VAT) but fixed (e.g. always 6p/minute or always 8.5p/minute) from BT landline, other providers may charge more; up to 50p a minute from mobiles.
0873 xxx xxxx	Up to 8.5p a minute (plus VAT) but fixed (e.g. always 6p/minute or always 8.5p/minute) from BT landline, other providers may charge more; up to 50p a minute from mobiles.

The usage of 0871, 0872 and 0873 numbers is regulated by PhonepayPlus.

There was widespread confusion about the cost of calling 084 and 087 numbers until 2015. They often do not qualify for discounts and bundled minutes, and can be prohibitively expensive when called from mobiles and payphones. Many major companies persist in misdescribing them as "Local Rate", "Lo Call" (often as 'locall rate' which can be easily misread as 'local rate') or "National Rate" for which the Advertising Standards Authority can take action.

==== Access charge and service charge ====
From 1 July 2015, the charge for calls to 084, 087, 09 and 118 numbers has been simplified. It is split into two parts: An access charge, payable to the telephone service provider – e.g. BT, EE, Sky – plus a service charge paid to the company offering the service.

Companies with 084, 087, and 09 numbers must declare the service charge element of the call cost when advertising their phone number; for example, a number may be advertised saying "Calls cost 20p per minute plus your phone company's access charge". Telecoms companies must inform their customers about their access charge for calling each number range. The EU Consumer Rights Directive requires that many entities that held 084 and 087 numbers will no longer be allowed to use them. The directive bans the usage of numbers that cost more than calling a geographic number for customer service and complaints lines, and other such purposes. Since Britain left the EU the Directive as such no longer applies, but its provisions may have been incorporated into British law.

=== Other 08xx number ranges ===
- 08xx xxx xxxx—Internet for schools and Inbound routing codes.

0820 xxx xxxx	Special Services: Internet for schools
0899 9xx xxxx	Inbound routing codes

=== Premium rate content services (PRS and SES) ===
- 09xx xxx xxxx—Premium Rate Content Services

Numbers in the 09xx range are charged at the highest rates of any calls within the United Kingdom, and are controlled by various regulations regarding their use. The regulator is the Phone-paid Services Authority, formerly PhonepayPlus. There are a large number of charge bands, some with high pence-per-minute rates, others with a high fixed-price for the entire call.

090x xxx xxxx	Premium rate content services (PRS)
0908 xxx xxxx 0909 xxx xxxx	Sexual entertainment services (SES) (not available for new allocations)
091x xxx xxxx	Premium rate non-content services (PRS)
098x xxx xxxx	Sexual entertainment services (SES)

The earlier unused 092x xxx xxxx – 099x xxx xxxx allocation for "Broadband Internet Services" no longer exists and was removed from the number plan in 2005.

=== Telex Service Numbers – initial Geographic Area Codes and applicable designation ===
Designation Numbers beginning 2 to 9

10-digits long

Number(s) beginning	Designation
2, 88, 89, and 91 to 94 inclusive	London
31	Coventry
32	Peterborough
33	Birmingham
34	Leicester
35	Shrewsbury
36	Stoke-on-Trent
37	Nottingham
41	Bournemouth and Channel Islands
42	Exeter
43	Gloucester
44	Bristol
45	Plymouth
46	Taunton
47	Southampton
48	Swansea
49	Cardiff
51	Bradford
52	Scarborough and Holderness
53	Newcastle
54	Sheffield
55	Leeds
56	Lincoln
57	York
58	Middlesbrough
59	Kingston-upon-Hull
61	Chester
620	Liverpool
621	Isle of Man
622-629	Liverpool
63	Blackburn
64	Carlisle
65	Lancaster
66	Manchester
67	Preston
72	Edinburgh
73	Aberdeen
74	Belfast
75	Inverness
76	Dundee
77	Glasgow
81	Cambridge
82	Luton
83	Oxford
84	Reading
85	Guildford
86	Portsmouth
87	Brighton
95	Tunbridge Wells
96	Canterbury
97	Norwich
98	Colchester
99	Southend-on-Sea

== Crown Dependencies ==
Although calls from UK landlines to landlines in the islands are charged at the same rate as those to other UK landlines (i.e. they are not treated as international calls), calls may be excluded from calling plans offering unlimited UK fixed-line calls.

Mobile operators may also charge more for calls to the islands and these calls are usually excluded from calling plans. Calls and SMS messages sent to island mobile phone numbers are not charged at the same rate as calls to UK mobile phone numbers.

=== Channel Islands ===
==== Guernsey ====
This area code is used for the Bailiwick of Guernsey (i.e. including Alderney and Sark).

(01481) xxx xxx	Fixed line	48 = GU
(01481) 822 xxx	Fixed line (Alderney)	48 = GU
(01481) 823 xxx	Fixed line (Alderney)	48 = GU
(01481) 824 xxx	Fixed line (Alderney)	48 = GU
(01481) 832 xxx	Fixed line (Sark)	48 = GU
(01481) 833 xxx	Fixed line (Sark)	48 = GU
07781 xxx xxx	Sure mobile phones and pagers	
07839 xxx xxx	Airtel Vodafone mobile phones	
07911 xxx xxx	Wave Telecom mobile phones, not for the UK	

==== Jersey ====
(01534) xxx xxx	Fixed line	53 = JE
07509 xxx xxx	Jersey Telecom mobile phones and pagers	
07797 xxx xxx	Jersey Telecom mobile phones and pagers	
07937 xxx xxx	Jersey Telecom mobile phones and pagers	
07700 xxx xxx	Sure mobile network	
07829 xxx xxx	Airtel Vodafone mobile network	

Several Jersey companies also have non-geographic numbers allocated.

=== Isle of Man ===
(01624) xxx xxx	Fixed line	62 = MA
07624 xxx xxx	Mobile phones and paging services	
07524 xxx xxx	Mobile phones additional capacity	
07924 xxx xxx	Mobile phones additional capacity	

On the Isle of Man, both fixed (01624) and mobile phone (07624) numbers can be dialled locally in the six-digit format.

== Fictitious numbers ==
Ofcom has also reserved certain number ranges for use in media productions, such as radio and television dramas and films; so as to avoid the risk of people having genuine telephone numbers displayed and receiving unwanted calls. This is similar to the use of fictitious telephone numbers in other countries.

In most of the large cities with three-digit area codes, a range of numbers is reserved, usually all the numbers starting with the digits 496. For fictitious numbers in other areas not using three-digit area codes, the area code 01632 is reserved; this code is not in use, although 0632 was previously used for Newcastle upon Tyne until the late 1980s (63 = NE), and briefly reallocated for use by premium rate services in the 1990s. There are also reserved ranges for fictitious mobile, freephone, and premium rate numbers.

The Post Office even produced dial centre labels for use in advertisements and film / TV with a mythical exchange called VINcent plus four digits. The numerical equivalent of VIN was 846, and all the caller got was the speaking clock (i.e. 846 is also numerical equivalent of TIM) in the big city 'Director' areas.

At around the same time as the other Big Number Change changes, Ofcom revised their recommendations to update the prefixes, add additional areas and increase the size of the allocation from 10 to 1,000 numbers per block. Those changes are listed in the Big Number Change article.

In Coronation Street, the fictional Manchester suburb of Weatherfield uses the unallocated range 0161 715 xxxx.

Mobile numbers beginning with 07700 are frequently seen in TV dramas. These numbers have been specifically set aside for TV and radio dramas.

== Special service numbers ==
=== Emergency services and helplines ===
The UK has two free emergency numbers: the traditional 999, which is still widely used, and the EU standard 112. Both 999 and 112 are used to contact all emergency services: Police, Fire Service, Ambulance Service and Coastguard. (Standard advice for Mountain Rescue or Cave Rescue is to ask the emergency operator for the police, who oversee the communication with these two services.)

Both numbers can be called from mobile phones with the keylock on or without entering the PIN where that would otherwise be required. Although some mobile phones allow emergency calls to be attempted without a SIM card, at present the UK networks reject such calls. Since November 2009, an emergency call can be made through any UK mobile network as long as there is a SIM for any valid UK network in the handset. Although UK VOIP phone providers are required to offer 999 / 112 service, this is subject to a registration for the service and with a verified service address and users need to be aware such service may not work in a power blackout; however, International VOIP providers may not provide this service.

The chargeable number 101 was introduced for non-urgent crime and community safety calls on a trial basis in 2006. In Wales, the scheme was taken forward by all four police forces, who adopted the number for non-emergency calls on a permanent basis in early 2009. In England, the scheme was on trial until 2012, when it was adopted nationwide and the cost to call changed from 10p per call to 15p per call. In Northern Ireland, the number was introduced by the Police Service of Northern Ireland in March 2014. Since 1 April 2020 the number is free to call.

The operator is obtained via 100 from landlines, while directory enquiries, formerly 192, is now provided in the 118xxx range, (not to be confused with 0118, the area code for Reading.) e.g. 118 212, 118 800, 118 500, 118 118, by different companies. International operator assistance is reached through 155.

From early 2010, the pan-European 116 number range came into use for social helplines. The first three numbers allocated were Missing People using 116 000 for a missing children helpline, the NSPCC ChildLine on 116 111, and Samaritans using 116 123 for an emotional support helpline. A recent consultation for the numbers 116 106 and 116 117 has yet to see any result.

The National Health Service (NHS) can be reached on 111 for non-emergency calls (from landlines and mobiles only). In other European countries, the number 116 117 is used for a similar purpose.

The NHS has also launched a COVID-19 helpline on 119 so that these calls do not go through the 111 call centre.

Local electricity network operators can be reached on 105 to report power cuts.

Two telephone helplines within the regular code space have only eight digits: 0800 11 11 for ChildLine and 0845 4647 for NHS Direct in Wales.

The number 159 ('Call 159') was introduced in 2021 to give a standard number for calling banks, in an effort to reduce scams where people are tricked into calling someone pretending to be their bank.

=== Speaking clock ===
Since the mid-1990s, speaking clock services have been available throughout Great Britain using the number 123. Before this, exchanges in "Director" areas (Birmingham, Edinburgh, Glasgow, Liverpool, London and Manchester) dialled 846 (TIM), later changing to 123; main exchanges in "non-Director" areas originally used "952", later changing to "80" with the introduction of STD and eventually to "8081" as other recorded services were introduced on 80X1 codes. Some mobile operators allocate other services to 123, such as customer services or voicemail.

=== Automated services and access codes ===
Short codes beginning with 1 are reserved for telecom service providers' own functionality; some of the most well-known are codes for use with Caller Display:

Code	Function	Notes
141	Withhold number	When normally released
1470	Release number	When normally withheld
1471	Last call information and return	Caller may press 3 to return call on most networks.
1475	1471 erasure	Removes details of last call from 1471 service. May need to be prefixed with 1470 if number is normally withheld.
1477	Automatic Call Trace	Stores number (even if withheld) of nuisance caller at terminating exchange for subsequent investigation and enforcement, but service is seldom enabled by default.
1571	Voicemail service	For people who do not have answering machines. If there is a new message, the dial tone will be stuttered.
1572	BT Call Protect	To divert nuisance calls to junk voicemail.
#31#	Withhold number	141 equivalent for use on mobile networks

Many fixed-line telephone subscribers, e.g. of BT, Virgin Media, SkyTalk, TalkTalk, and PlusNet, have the opportunity to use an automated messaging service which takes messages when the called number is either engaged ("busy") or not answered within a given time. This can be accessed by calling 1571.

For fixed-line users, it is possible to override the carrier pre-selection (CPS) on a per-call basis, dialling a special code before the number, e.g. 1280 for BT, 1664 for LowerCall, or 1844 for Daisy. Ofcom defines the range for these as: "124 to 140, 143 to 146, 148 to 149, 160 to 169, and 181 to 189, inclusive. Numbers of up to 5 digits used to access an Indirect Access Provider ('Type B Access Codes')".

== Telephone numbers in Overseas Territories ==
Telephone numbers in British Overseas Territories do not come under the UK telephone numbering plan. These calls are treated as international calls. Below are the access codes for the overseas territories:

=== North American Numbering Plan ===
- Anguilla +1 264 xxx-xxxx
- Bermuda +1 441 xxx-xxxx
- British Virgin Islands +1 284 xxx-xxxx
- Cayman Islands +1 345 xxx-xxxx
- Montserrat +1 664 xxx-xxxx
- Turks and Caicos Islands +1 649 xxx-xxxx

=== Others ===
- British Antarctic Territory +44 (Shared with the UK)
- British Indian Ocean Territory +246
- Falkland Islands and South Georgia and the South Sandwich Islands +500
- Gibraltar +350
- Saint Helena and Tristan da Cunha +290
- Ascension Island +247
- Akrotiri and Dhekelia +357 (Shared with Cyprus)
- Pitcairn Islands +64 (Shared with New Zealand)

== See also ==
- Big Number Change
- List of dialling codes in the United Kingdom
- List of UK dialling codes covering Wales
- Non-geographic telephone numbers in the United Kingdom
- Telecommunications in the United Kingdom
- Telephone number portability
- Telephone numbers in Ireland
- UK telephone code misconceptions—includes the common "0207" and "0208" misconceptions
- Calling party pays
