= WPHL =

WPHL may refer to:

- WPHL-TV, a television station (channel 17 digital) licensed to Philadelphia, Pennsylvania, United States
- Western Professional Hockey League, professional league from 1996 to 2001
- Western Pennsylvania Hockey League, semi-professional league in the early 1900s

== See also ==
- Professional Women's Hockey League (PWHL)
- WHL (disambiguation)
- PHL (disambiguation)
