= WHL (disambiguation) =

The Western Hockey League is a major junior ice hockey league based in Western Canada and the Northwestern United States.

WHL may also refer to:

== Ice hockey ==
- Western Hockey League (1952–1974), minor pro ice hockey league
- Western Hockey League (1925–26), final iteration of the Western Canada Hockey League major pro ice hockey league
- Women's Hockey League (founded 2015), official name of the Zhenskaya Hockey League, a professional ice hockey league in Eurasia

== Other uses ==
- West of Harvey Lock, measurement of distance along the Gulf Intracoastal Waterway
- White Hart Lane railway station (National Rail station code WHL), a railway station in Tottenham, London, England

== See also ==
- WHA (disambiguation)
- WPHL (disambiguation)
