= WHA =

WHA may refer to:

== Government ==
- World Health Assembly, the meetings of the World Health Organization (WHO)
- Bureau of Western Hemisphere Affairs, within the U.S. Department of State

== Sport ==
- World Hockey Association, a defunct major professional hockey league active from 1972 to 1979
- World Hockey Association (proposed), organization that controlled WHA Hockey interests between 2004 and 2008
  - WHA Junior West Hockey League, a defunct Junior A Hockey league based out of the Cascadia area associated with the proposed WHA
  - World Hockey Association 2, a defunct minor professional hockey league, tiered under the proposed WHA

== Education and academia ==
- World History Association, academic organization
- Wallace Hall (Thornhill), a 2-18 school located in Thornhill, Dumfries and Galloway

== Travel ==
- West Houston Airport, a privately owned, public use airport in Harris County, Texas.
- Whampoa station, MTR station code WHA
- Wuhan railway station, China Railway pinyin code WHA
- Wuhu Xuanzhou Airport, IATA code WHA

== Media ==
- WHA (AM), a radio station (970 AM) licensed to Madison, Wisconsin, United States
- WHA-TV, a television station (channel 20, virtual 21) licensed to Madison, Wisconsin, United States
- Witch Hat Atelier, a Japanese manga series

== Other ==
- Wolfram Heavy Alloy, any of various alloys of tungsten (wolfram) used for their high density in applications such as kinetic energy penetrators, counterbalancers, and ballast

== See also ==
- WHL (disambiguation)
