= 020 =

Dialling code for London in the United Kingdom

United Kingdom area code for London
- National calling: 020
- International calling: +44 20
- Conservation: No
- Active since: 1 June 1999 (Note: 020 could be used from 1 June 1999 and the previous 0171 and 0181 codes could no longer be used from 22 April 2000.)
- Previous code: 0171, 0181
- Earlier code: 01; 071, 081
- Number format: 020 xxxx xxxx

Coverage
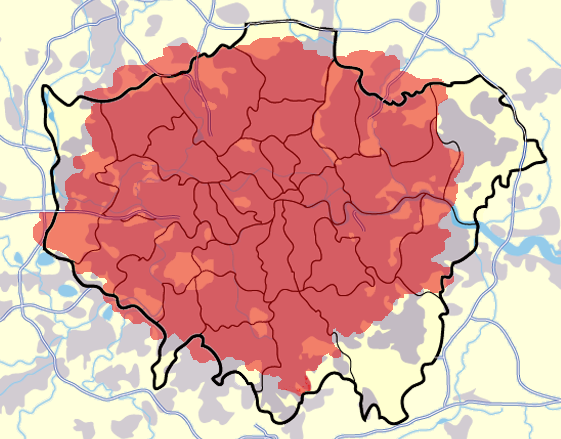
- Approximate coverage of 020 code (red), compared to Greater London boundary (black)
- Area served: Bushey Heath; Chigwell; Elstree; Ewell; London; Loughton; Thames Ditton

020 is the national dialling code for London in the United Kingdom. All subscriber numbers within the area code consist of eight digits and it has capacity for approaching 100 million telephone numbers. The code is used at 170 telephone exchanges in and around Greater London as part of the largest linked numbering scheme in the United Kingdom. In common with all other British area codes the initial '0' is a trunk prefix that is not required when dialling London from abroad.

The 020 area code fully replaced older area codes for London on 22 April 2000, following multiple telephone number changes during the 1990s.

As is the case for other codes in the UK, the 020 area code may also be used for services without any physical presence in the area, such as private networks or virtual numbering. One such user is the Foreign and Commonwealth Office Telecommunications Network, provided by Global Crossing, 020 is also one of the dialling codes used for telephone services on the remote South Atlantic island of Tristan da Cunha.

== History ==
=== London telephone area ===
Before the introduction of national dialling codes, the area now served by 020 had a large multiple telephone exchange system, called the London telephone area. The first exchange in this area, Central, was opened in the City of London on 1 March 1902. The Director telephone system was developed so that subscribers in London could call one another in a linked numbering scheme regardless of whether they were on a manual local exchange or an automatic one.

In 1927, Holborn, the first Director automatic exchange in London, was cut over to the new system at midnight on Saturday 12 November. Because it was mainly a business exchange, most subscribers did not use the new system until Monday 14 November. The successful changeover was delayed by subscribers' unfamiliarity with dialling. Bishopgate and Sloane exchanges followed in six weeks, after which came Western and Monument exchanges. Because the London area contained 80 exchanges, complete conversion took many years.

By 1934, the London telephone area comprised all 147 exchanges within 12 1/2 miles (20 km) of Oxford Circus. By 1950, the London Director system had 75 exchanges within a 5-mile (8 km) radius of Oxford Circus and a further 65 in the 5–10-mile (8–16 km) belt. In Greater London (in other words, within 20 miles (32 km) of Oxford Circus), there were 237 exchanges. In January 1956 a new director exchange – "SKYport" – was opened at London Heathrow Airport.

=== Exchange codes ===
From 1922, the first three digits of a seven-digit subscriber number – in other words, the local exchange codes – were represented with letters by way of a mnemonic. Each three-character code corresponded to an exchange within the London telephone area. The subscriber numbers were written, for example, as "ABBey 1234" and "WIMbledon 1234" or "ABB 1234" and "WIM 1234". By 1965, there were 350 local exchanges in London and the number of permutations that could be used for exchange names had been exhausted. With the change to all-figure dialling in 1966, the system of mnemonics was withdrawn and the three-digit local exchange codes of many subscribers were altered. The old codes continued to work in parallel with new codes until January 1970, when the "ANN: All-figure Numbers Now" advertising campaign prompted callers to use only the new codes. The transition to all-figure dialling allowed the codes to be grouped into eight sectors; all exchanges within 6 kilometres (3.7 mi) of the centre of London formed the Central sector and the other sectors radiated from it.

Sector	Local exchange code prefixes
Central	21–28, 32, 35, 37, 38, 40, 43, 48, 49, 58, 60, 61, 62, 63, 70, 72, 73, 79, 82, 83, 92, 93
East	47, 50, 51, 52, 53, 55, 59, 98
South	64, 65, 66, 67, 68, 76, 77
South East	29, 30, 31, 46, 69, 85
South West	33, 39, 54, 78, 87, 94, 97
North	34, 36, 44, 80, 88
North West	20, 42, 45, 86, 90, 95, 96
West	56, 57, 74, 75, 84, 89, 99

The first three digits of a subscriber number continued to indicate the exchange to which the number belonged; for example, "222 1234" was in Westminster (Central Sector) and "946 1234" in Wimbledon (South West Sector). (Note: The numerical codes for Westminster and Wimbledon did not change when all-figure dialling was introduced because the first two digits of their exchange codes corresponded to the sectors they became part of.) More than one local exchange code was usually overlaid for each area, so all Wimbledon numbers did not necessarily begin "946". Subscriber numbers changed to eight digits in 2000 when an additional 7 or 8 was added to each local exchange code (for example, "7222 1234" in Westminster and "8946 1234" in Wimbledon).

=== STD code ===
Example telephone number
1959–1966	STD codes introduced	01-WIM 0123
1966–1990	All-figure dialling	01-946 0123
1990–1995	Area code split	081-946 0123
1995–2000	PhONEday	0181 946 0123
2000–present	Big Number Change	020 8946 0123

The STD code 01 was assigned to the London telephone area on 6 April 1959 as part of preparations for subscriber trunk dialling. For the next thirty years, "01" became synonymous with the capital. Until May 1990, the 01 code covered the same area as the current 020 code and had capacity for fewer than 10 million telephone numbers.

In May 1990, the 01 code was abandoned and the area divided between 071 – which covered exchanges in the Central sector – and 081, which covered all other sectors. Exceptionally, two exchanges in the East sector (Note: Albert Dock and Poplar exchanges were not in the Central sector but were included in the 071 code.) covering the London Docklands redevelopment area were assigned the 071 code. The anticipation that the code associated with central districts would be more prestigious than the other associated with the outer suburbs was used as a plot device in the Essex-based TV comedy series Birds of a Feather. At the time of the split, there were five local exchange codes assigned to Mercury Communications (Note: Exchange codes 528, 895, 945, 975 and 982 were assigned to Mercury Communications.) and numbers in these ranges could be assigned to either code. This area code split doubled the potential capacity. In 1995, on "PhONEday", the codes changed again, to 0171 and 0181.

Sequence of code changes.

The split into two area codes only lasted a decade. As part of the Big Number Change on 22 April 2000, the 0171 and 0181 codes were replaced with 020, following a period of dual-running that began on 1 June 1999 when the new 020 code was activated and ended on 14 October 2000 when the old 0171 and 0181 codes were finally ceased. The 22 April 2000 change also affected subscriber local numbers which gained an extra digit. "0171-xxx xxxx" numbers changed to "(020) 7xxx xxxx", while "0181-xxx xxxx" numbers became "(020) 8xxx xxxx". As a result of this history, there is now a widespread misconception that 0207 and 0208 are the dialling codes for parts of London. This was exacerbated when local numbers beginning 3 started to be issued.

The reunification under a single code created capacity for approaching 100 million telephone numbers and, starting in 2005, subscriber numbers beginning with the digit "3" were issued alongside those beginning "7" and "8". In August 2019, Ofcom announced that subscriber numbers beginning with the digit "4" will also be introduced.

=== Charge group ===
The London telephone area operated as a single group for charging purposes in which all calls were priced at local rate. Additionally, as was usual, calls to and from the adjacent charge groups were charged as local. (Note: Calls to London from each of the 01322, 01372, 01689, 01707, 01708, 01727, 01737, 01753, 01784, 01883, 01895, 01923, 01932, 01959 and 01992 area codes were charged at local rate, as were calls from London to each of those area codes.)

== Coverage ==
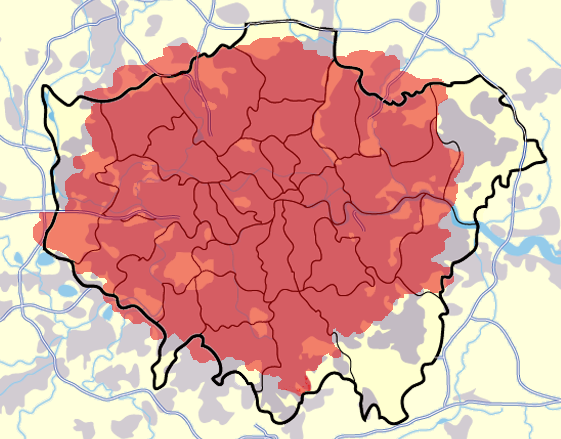
Coverage of the 020 area code

The code serves a roughly circular area with a radius of 12 miles from the centre of London. The Greater London boundary varies from 11 miles to 20 miles from the centre and consequently some outer districts are covered by adjacent codes and in some places the 020 code extends beyond the Greater London boundary. The code covers an area larger than the London post town where letters addressed to "LONDON" are delivered.

The City of London and at least some part of all 32 London boroughs are within the 020 area code. There are six exchanges outside Greater London that use the 020 code. (Note: Bushey Heath, Elstree, Ewell, Hainault (Chigwell), Loughton and Thames Ditton exchanges are outside Greater London.) Communities outside Greater London that are within the code are Buckhurst Hill, Chigwell, Loughton and Sewardstone in Essex; Borehamwood, Bushey, Carpenders Park, Elstree and South Oxhey in Hertfordshire; and Ewell, Molesey, Thames Ditton and Whyteleafe in Surrey.

There are eighteen exchanges within Greater London that do not use the 020 code. (Note: Biggin Hill, Crayford, Denham, Downland, Erith, Farnborough, Harefield, Hornchurch, Ingrebourne, Lodge Hill, Northwood, Orpington, Rainham, Romford, Ruislip, Slade Green, Upminster, Uxbridge and West Drayton do not use the 020 code.) The six boroughs that have significant areas within other codes are Bexley, partly within the Dartford (01322) code; Bromley, partly within the Orpington (01689) and Westerham (01959) codes; Croydon, partly within the Orpington (01689) and Redhill (01737) codes; Enfield, partly within the Waltham Cross (01992) code; Havering, mostly within the Romford (01708) code; and Hillingdon, partly within the Uxbridge (01895), Slough (01753) and Watford (01923) codes.

== Number allocation ==
With the introduction of the (020) area code, as part of the Big Number Change, subscriber numbers were changed from 7-digits (xxx xxxx) to 8-digits (xxxx xxxx). This allowed new ranges of numbers to be issued. Under the National Telephone Numbering Plan the code operates with the following sub-ranges:

020
0xxx xxxx 1xxx xxxx	national dialling only
2xxx xxxx	reserved for future use
3xxx xxxx	new local numbers issued after move to 020 (since 2005)
4xxx xxxx	new local numbers issued after move to 020 (since 2019)
5xxx xxxx 6xxx xxxx	reserved for future use
70xx xxxx 71xx xxxx	new local numbers issued after move to 020 (since 2000)
72xx xxxx 73xx xxxx 74xx xxxx 75xx xxxx 76xx xxxx 77xx xxxx 78xx xxxx 79xx xxxx	local numbers transferred from 0171
80xx xxxx 81xx xxxx	new local numbers issued after move to 020 (since 2000)
82xx xxxx 83xx xxxx 84xx xxxx 85xx xxxx 86xx xxxx 87xx xxxx 88xx xxxx 89xx xxxx	local numbers transferred from 0181
9xxx xxxx	reserved for future use

In 2006 59% of numbers within the 020 code were allocated to BT. The area code is not subject to number conservation and the regulator Ofcom does not restrict the size of number blocks that are allocated.
