= List of UK dialling codes covering Wales =

This is a list of geographic UK dialling codes covering Wales that are currently in use. Some exchanges cover both sides of the Wales-England border. All geographic telephone numbers in Wales are in the format (01xxx) xxxxxx, with the exception of Cardiff and the surrounding area which has been (029) xxxx xxxx since the "Big Number Change" in 2000.

Dialling Code	Area
01239	Cardigan
01244	Chester
01248	Bangor
01267	Carmarthen
01269	Ammanford
01286	Caernarfon
01291	Chepstow
01341	Barmouth
01348	Fishguard
01352	Mold
01407	Holyhead
01437	Clynderwen & Haverfordwest
01443	Pontypridd
01446	Barry
01490	Corwen
01492	Colwyn Bay
01495	Pontypool
01497	Hay on Wye
01544	Kington
01545	Llanarth
01547	Knighton
01550	Llandovery
01554	Llanelli
01558	Llandeilo
01559	Llandysul
01570	Lampeter
01591	Llanwrtyd Wells
01597	Llandrindod Wells
01600	Monmouth
01633	Newport
01639	Neath
01646	Milford Haven
01650	Cemmaes Road
01654	Machynlleth
01656	Bridgend
01678	Bala
01685	Merthyr Tydfil
01686	Llanidloes & Newtown
01690	Betws-y-Coed
01691	Oswestry
01745	Rhyl
01758	Pwllheli
01766	Porthmadog
01792	Swansea
01824	Ruthin
01834	Narberth
01873	Abergavenny
01874	Brecon
01938	Welshpool
01948	Whitchurch
01970	Aberystwyth
01974	Llanon
01978	Wrexham
01982	Builth Wells
01994	St Clears
029	Cardiff

(Source: "The Phone Book - Code Companion", BT)

== Misconceptions ==
It is a common misconception that the code for Cardiff is 02920, whereas in fact it is 029 followed by an eight-digit local number. This is due to Cardiff previously having a longer code (0222 then 01222) with six-digit local numbers. From 2000, all of its local numbers (until 2005) had the additional 20 added to them, making them 8 digits long. This problem is also widespread in cities with other 02x codes such as Coventry, London, Portsmouth and Southampton, and in the region of Northern Ireland.

== See also ==
- List of United Kingdom dialling codes
- UK telephone numbering plan
- Telephone numbers in the United Kingdom
- Telecommunications in the United Kingdom
- UK telephone code misconceptions
