= PHL =

PHL may stand for:

== Places ==
- The Philippines (ISO 3166-1 alpha-3 country code PHL)
- Philadelphia International Airport (IATA airport code PHL)
- 30th Street Station (Amtrak station code PHL), a railroad station in Philadelphia
- Pacific Harbor Line (reporting mark PHL), a short line railroad serving the ports of Long Beach and Los Angeles

== Groups, organizations, companies ==
- Planet Half-Life, a videogaming website
- The Planetary Habitability Laboratory, a remote laboratory for the habitability of exoplanets

=== Hockey leagues ===
- Pro Hokei Ligasy
- Polska Hokej Liga
- Pacific Hockey League, a defunct ice hockey league in the United States
- Pakistan Hockey League, a field hockey league in Pakistan
- Premier Hockey League, a defunct field hockey league in India
- Professional Hockey League, a defunct ice hockey league in Ukraine

== Other uses ==
- Philosophiae Licentiata (female) or Philosophiae Licentiatus (male), Licentiate in Philosophy, abbreviated as "PhL" or "Ph.L."
- Phl., code for the Epistle to the Philippians, a part of Christian Bible
- Phl — 2,4-Diacetylphloroglucinol, a natural antibiotic produced by some Pseudomonas species

== See also ==
- WPHL (disambiguation)
- PWHL (disambiguation)
