= UK telephone code misconceptions =

Confusion over telephone numbers in the United Kingdom

Widespread UK telephone code misconceptions, in particular brought on by the Big Number Change in 2000, have been reported by regulator Ofcom since publication of a report it commissioned in 2004.

The telephone area code for most of Greater London and some surrounding areas is 020, not "0207", "0208" or "0203". A study was commissioned in 2005 which found that only 13 per cent of respondents correctly identified the 020 code for London without prompting; 59 per cent incorrectly identified it as "0207" or "0208". This is not just an issue of number appearance; the correct way to call a London landline number from a landline within the London telephone area is to dial the last 8 digits. The trunk prefix "0", and area dialling code "20", if included, are ignored.

Other area codes with similarly widespread misconceptions about the correct area code include Bristol, Cardiff, Coventry, Leeds, Leicester, Northern Ireland, Nottingham, Portsmouth, Reading, Sheffield and Southampton.

== Background ==
Owing to the marked increase in demand for telephone numbers to be available for allocation since the 1990s, the United Kingdom's telephone numbering system has been restructured several times on both a national and regional level, resulting in several modifications to the way British telephone numbers are written. As a consequence of these changes, many people were left with a misunderstanding of how the system of area codes and local numbers operates.

A standard United Kingdom fixed telephone number (i.e. a landline, or geographical number, as opposed to a mobile telephone number or special rate non-geographic fixed line) is divided into three parts, the trunk prefix code (0 in the UK), an STD code (area code) followed by a local number. The STD (Subscriber Trunk Dialling) code indicates the geographical area of the number, and is dialled before the local number. For the majority of calls dialled within the same area, the trunk prefix and area code need not be dialled, but are ignored if they are.

Owing to number-capacity constraints, fixed line callers in Bournemouth, Poole and Christchurch (01202) must dial the full STD code even when calling local numbers. From October 2014, similar schemes were implemented in Aberdeen (01224), Bradford (01274), Brighton (01273), Middlesbrough (01642) and Milton Keynes (01908). Specifically, the requirement to dial the full number allowed for numbers to be allocated in which the first digit after the area code begins with a zero or a one. This change makes about 200,000 new numbers available for each area code in which the change has been made. Some telephone service providers differentiate ordinary calling costs using the relevant area code(s).

Until STD was introduced, only telephone operators could connect calls over the trunks (long-distance links between major exchanges). A subscriber would have to dial 0 for the operator and then request a long-distance call. As STD was introduced area by area the meaning of the 0 changed; it was now the trunk prefix used to raise a call automatically to the trunk dialling level, what telephone companies now call a National call. The new code of 100 was introduced for calling an operator. The leading 0 is not part of an area code, which is why international callers dialling into the UK must not dial it.

For historical and operational reasons, the area code plus local number can have varying total and composite digit lengths, but as a rule they do not exceed 11 digits in combined length. For readability, and to distinguish geographic location, telephone numbers are often spoken, displayed and published with a gap between the area code and local number, or with the area code in (parentheses). Problems may occur for the reader when this spacing or formatting is incorrectly applied by the publisher.

== London numbers ==
=== History of the confusion ===
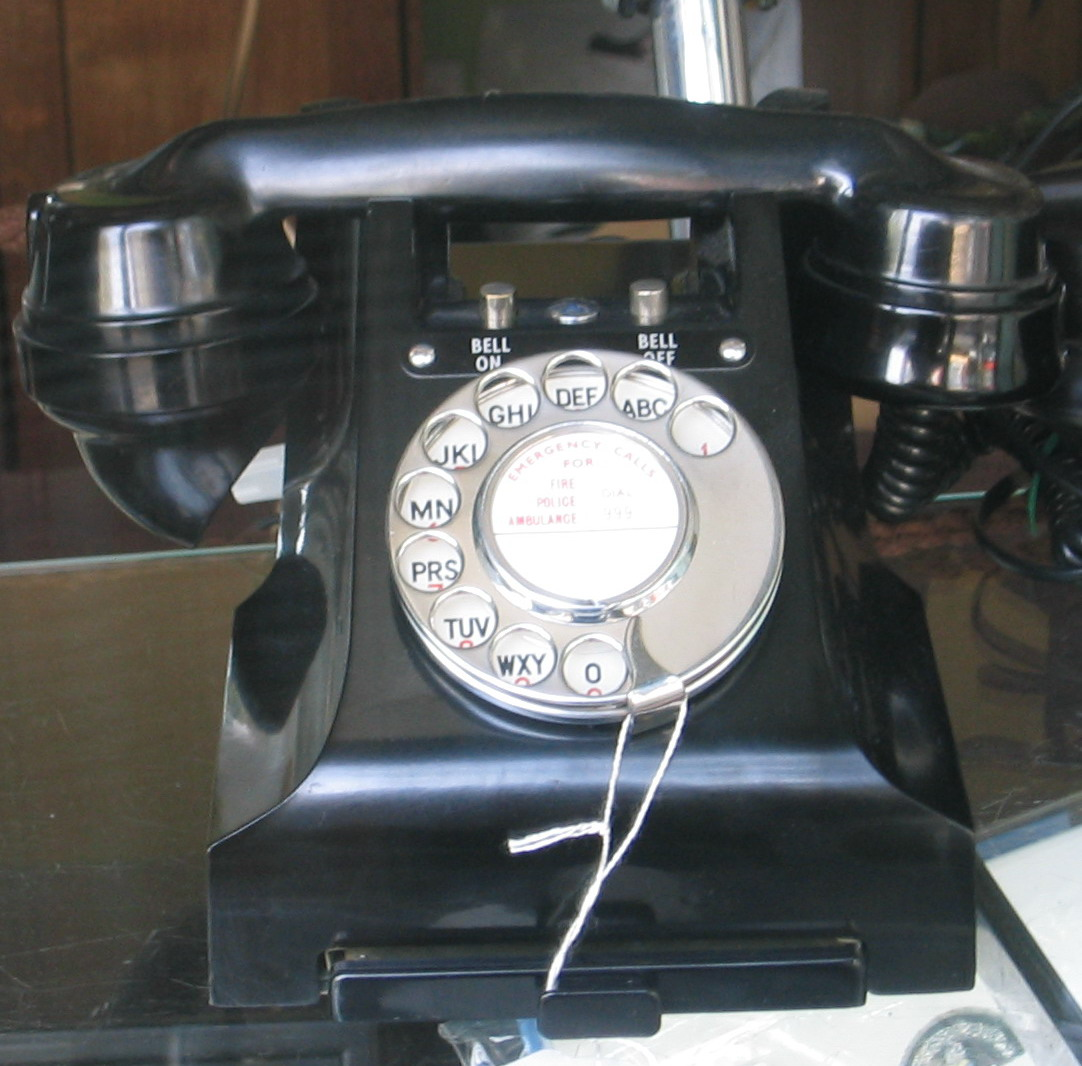
1950s UK phone with letters on its rotary dial, as was typical for the time

When the UK's original STD codes were allocated in the late 1950s, London was given the code 01. Relatively few subscribers could dial trunk calls, so the 01 code was not generally included as part of the published telephone number. In the early 1960s, London telephones still had exchange names so the first three letters had to be dialled before the four-digit local number, e.g. ABBey 1234 (London Transport).

In the mid-1960s, All Figure Numbers (AFNs) were introduced in London and five other large cities because the number of meaningful letter combinations was becoming exhausted (and the letters mapped to the numbers in a slightly different way to the US, which would be problematic for international dialling). The STD codes were incorporated as part of the AFN, ABBey 1234 becoming 01-222 1234. Callers in London were still instructed to dial only the seven digits (those after the hyphen) when calling other London numbers because a charging error would result if the 01 code were dialled, with the call being charged as a national call rather than a local call; the same principle applied for local calls within the other AFN areas. This restriction was eventually phased out as exchanges were modernised and the STD code was shown in brackets to standardise with the format used in non-AFN areas, e.g. Canterbury (0227) 234567. The term 'Area Code' also replaced 'STD Code' which had become outdated.

In May 1990, the single London area was split into two areas because of increased demand. Inner London was given the code 071, such as (071) 222 1234, and the rest 081. A local number (e.g. 222 1234) could then be used twice within London – once in 071 and again in 081. The local numbers remained as seven digits. This doubled the numbers available for London, but it also meant that a caller, though within London, might have had to dial the area code to reach another 'London' number. Call charges between the adjacent areas remained at a local rate.

To free up more numbers across the UK for future use, on Easter Sunday, 16 April 1995 (dubbed "PhONEday"), an extra digit "1" was inserted after the initial zero into all except five geographical area codes nationwide, so inner and outer London became 0171 and 0181 respectively: for example, (0171) 222 1234. At the same time, those five other places gained a brand new 011x area code. The town of Reading later was allocated an 011x code to replace its former code as available numbers quickly became scarce after PhONEday, being done in stages between 1996 and 1998.

=== Reunification ===
Further increased demand for telephone numbers in London led to the need for more number-space; rather than again split area codes, it was decided to merge the 0171 and 0181 area codes back into one but add an extra digit to the start of each London local number, thus increasing the available numbers by a factor of five:

- Seven-digit range = 200 0000 – 998 9999, giving 7,990,000 numbers dialable without the area code (0171 or 0181) – 15,980,000 across the area of the two codes.
- Eight-digit range (levels 7 and 8 only) = 7000 0000 – 8999 9999, giving 18,000,000 numbers dialable without the area code (though it is doubtful that 7999 xxxx and 8999 xxxx were allocated because if the initial digit were omitted a false 999 call would have been dialled).
- Full eight-digit range = 2000 0000 – 9989 9999 giving 79,900,000 numbers dialable without the area code (020).
- Notes: 0xxx xxxx, 1xxx xxxx, and 999x xxxx ranges not available for local numbers. 0 – reserved for national dialling, 1xx used for short codes (e.g. 100 for the operator) and 999 for calling emergency services.

From 1 June 1999, the new 020 code for London was introduced to replace the 0171 and 0181 codes, re-unifying the London telephone area under one code as it had been under the 01 area code. All the previous seven-digit numbers had a 7 or 8 prefixed to them:

(0171) xxx xxxx became (020) 7xxx xxxx
(0181) xxx xxxx became (020) 8xxx xxxx

From 1 June 1999, London numbers could additionally be dialled with the new eight-digit number but it had to be preceded by the new area code 020 (or international equivalent).

From 22 April 2000, the 0171 and 0181 codes stopped working and callers dialling an 020 number from another 020 number could omit the 020 (in keeping with local dialling historically).

The following diagram shows the history of London's code, starting with the original unified 01 code and ending with the reunified 020 code:

=== Misquoting ===
Although London was only divided for ten years, and has since been reunited for much longer, people still frequently quote and write London numbers as if the city and surrounding suburbs were still split up into central and suburban areas by saying and writing "0207" and "0208". If the London number (020) 7222 1234 is written as 0207 222 1234, and then dialled in full, the destination will be reached. However, it is incorrect to place the pause as shown, because if the local number is incorrectly dialled on a landline from within London as just 222 1234, as it had been in the past, it will not be connected, because the first digit is now missing. On the day of the changeover, one in three callers failed to correctly use eight-digit local dialling.

Possible causes for the misunderstanding include the confusion created during the period from 1 June 1999 to 22 April 2000, where it was not possible to dial eight-digit local numbers; the fact that people had become very much accustomed to the audio rhythm of a four-digit area code (from hearing the old codes, "0171" and "0181" repeated previously); and that incorrectly formatted caller ID data continues to be transmitted on some telephone networks even as of 2012. In addition, many users are unaware that there is any local dialling procedure, probably because of the increasing popularity of mobile phones, from which the full national number must always be dialled.

Numerous examples of incorrectly formatted telephone numbers may still be seen in and around London, including signwriting on shop-fronts and commercial vehicles, and in newspaper advertisements. The incorrectly placed pauses are also heard in speech everywhere: in radio and television advertisements, and said by office workers misquoting their office numbers as "0207 xxx xxxx".

While some clear publicity explaining the change was produced, BT's directory-assistance service quoted the codes incorrectly and, until November 2009, their online phonebook still incorrectly showed "0207" as "London Inner" and "0208" as "London Outer".

A 2005 television advertisement for the mobile telephony provider O2 promoted a service that allows a user to select two area codes they can call for a reduced price; it also incorrectly showed 0207 and 0208 as different "area codes".

Outside London, in the areas that had newly assigned 011x codes in the 1990s, many mistakenly believed that the added digit, to lengthen the subscriber number to seven digits, was part of their new area code largely because these places originally had traditional area codes (being non-Director areas) and, as a result, many misquoted their numbers in the 011xx xxxxxx format, rather than in the correct 011x xxx xxxx format. In Reading, the confusion was furthered by the fact that dual running of the original 01734 and new 0118 codes was possible during the migration period, so it was possible to continue dialling the number locally in the six-digit format until 1998, when seven-digit numbers became mandatory. Because of this, many mistook the added 9 as being part of the new area code, rather than the subscriber number. Following the migration, new numbers beginning with 3xx, 4xx, 91x and 90x began to be issued.

Confusion is also caused by exchange automated changed number announcements where the voice synthesiser assumes that all area codes have four digits and places the spoken pause incorrectly.

=== London numbers added subsequently ===
From June 2005, new local numbers in London with an initial "3" like (020) 3222 1234 began to be allocated. Owing to the lingering confusion, people unaware of the correct format are beginning to assume erroneously that there is now a new London code, "0203". Even some local and national newspapers have given this misinformation. Some people report mis-dialling of London 3xxx xxxx numbers, where callers are dialling 0207 in front of the local number part instead of just 020. This call connects to (020) 73xx xxxx (ignoring the final digit) instead of to the expected number.

The digit 3 was chosen to minimise nuisance calls: on seeing an unfamiliar '020x' code, some callers would assume that it was an old pre-PhONEday code and would mistakenly 'correct' it to 0120x. 01203 and 01201 are the only 0120x codes that are not valid, the old Coventry code 01203 having been changed to 024.

The geographical significance of the "7" or "8" has been lost with regard to new number issuance so that, for example, some newly allocated numbers in central London now begin with "8".

In 2019, numbers in the range (020) 4xxx xxxx started to be issued.

== Other numbers ==
Although the problem is most prevalent in London, similar misconceptions also affect other area codes which were created as a result of PhONEday and the Big Number Change.

Area	Old numbering	Misconception	Correct new numbering
Belfast	(01232) xxxxxx	02890 xxxxxx	(028) 90xx xxxx
Bristol	(0272) xxxxxx	01179 xxxxxx	(0117) xxx xxxx
Cardiff	(01222) xxxxxx	02920 xxxxxx	(029) 2xxx xxxx
Coventry	(01203) xxxxxx	02476 xxxxxx	(024) 7xxx xxxx
Leeds	(0532) xxxxxx	01132 xxxxxx	(0113) xxx xxxx
Leicester	(0533) xxxxxx	01162 xxxxxx	(0116) xxx xxxx
Nottingham	(0602) xxxxxx	01159 xxxxxx	(0115) xxx xxxx
Portsmouth	(01705) xxxxxx	02392 xxxxxx	(023) 9xxx xxxx
Reading	(01734) xxxxxx	01189 xxxxxx	(0118) xxx xxxx
Sheffield	(0742) xxxxxx	01142 xxxxxx	(0114) xxx xxxx
Southampton	(01703) xxxxxx	02380 xxxxxx	(023) 8xxx xxxx

The inconvenience of the possible misconceptions subsequently became more significant and apparent, for example in Bristol with the issuing of new numbers within the 0117 code area where initially all numbers were revised such that their local 7-digit string began with 9. From 1997 new numbers began to be issued whose local 7-digit string began with a number other than 9, starting with 3xx-xxxx:

1. 1997 Local numbers beginning with 3 introduced
2. 2007 Local numbers beginning with 2 introduced
3. 2012 Local numbers beginning with 4 introduced

== International notation of UK numbers ==
The United Kingdom adopts an open dialling plan for area codes within its public switched telephone network. Therefore, all area codes have a preceding "0" when dialling from within the United Kingdom. When dialling a UK number from abroad, the zero must be omitted. Because of this, it has become common (but incorrect) practice to write telephone numbers used both nationally and internationally with the 0 in parentheses, for example: +44 (0)20 7946 0234; if the number is dialled with the parenthesised zero, the call will fail. ITU-T Recommendation E.123 states that parentheses should not be used in the international notation, the correct format being +44 20 7946 0234; the in-country form would be 020 7946 0234, shown separately.

== See also ==
- List of dialling codes in the United Kingdom
- Telecommunications in the United Kingdom
- Telephone numbering plan
