= PhONEday =

1995 day in which UK telephones were renumbered

Logo used in informational material.

PhONEday (/foʊn deɪ/ "phone day") was a change to telephone numbering in the United Kingdom on Sunday 16 April 1995. A shortage of unique telephone numbers in the old dialling system meant that it was becoming increasingly difficult in certain areas of the country to assign unique numbers to new subscribers. To counteract this, dialling codes starting with 0 were changed to start with 01. In Bristol, Leeds, Leicester, Nottingham and Sheffield, the existing area codes were entirely replaced with new codes comprising 4 digits, and the subscriber numbers lengthened from 6 to 7 digits. The changes made it possible to provision new numbers in each of these five cities. They also had the effect of assigning all geographic landline telephone numbers into one range of numbers starting with 01, allowing for further changes to be made at the Big Number Change in 2000. A £16m advertising campaign, and an eight-month parallel period during which both old and new codes were active, preceded the change. PhONEday followed a change made in May 1990, when the old London area code 01 was released from use, permitting all United Kingdom geographic numbers to begin with this prefix. Originally planned in 1991 to take place in 1994, in 1992 the change was postponed until the Easter Sunday bank holiday in 1995.

The PhONEday changes also released space for new geographic area codes beginning 02, which would come into use as part of the Big Number Change in 2000. The changes also allowed 10-digit numbers beginning 07, 08 and 09 to be used for mobile, non-geographic and premium-rate services, from 1997 onwards, with all remaining 9-digit mobile, non-geographic and premium-rate numbers from 02 to 09 being converted to 10 digits and moved into the 07, 08 and 09 prefixes in 2001.

== Number changes ==
=== Additional "1" ===
On PhONEday, 16 April 1995, the digit "1" was added after the initial "0" to prefix all geographic area codes. For example, the code for Inner London changed from 071 to 0171 and the code for Reading changed from 0734 to 01734.

=== New short codes ===
Five new shorter area codes were introduced for cities that were running low on available phone numbers and a digit was prepended to each subscriber number.

City	New numbering	Old numbering
Leeds	(0113) 2xx xxxx	(0532) xxxxxx
Sheffield	(0114) 2xx xxxx	(0742) xxxxxx
Nottingham	(0115) 9xx xxxx	(0602) xxxxxx
Leicester	(0116) 2xx xxxx	(0533) xxxxxx
Bristol	(0117) 9xx xxxx	(0272) xxxxxx

This also affected some national dialling only numbers for those cities:

City	New numbering	Old numbering
Leeds	0113 0ax xxxx	0532 0xxxxx
Leeds	0113 1ax xxxx	0532 1xxxxx
Sheffield	0114 0ax xxxx	0742 0xxxxx
Sheffield	0114 1ax xxxx	0742 1xxxxx
Nottingham	0115 0ax xxxx	0602 0xxxxx
Nottingham	0115 1ax xxxx	0602 1xxxxx
Leicester	0116 0ax xxxx	0533 0xxxxx
Leicester	0116 1ax xxxx	0533 1xxxxx
Bristol	0117 0ax xxxx	0272 0xxxxx
Bristol	0117 1ax xxxx	0272 1xxxxx

=== International access ===
The international access code also changed on PhONEday, from 010 to 00, thus meeting the international call prefix standard set by the International Telecommunication Union (ITU).

== Legacy ==
In cities that were running out of subscriber numbers, new sub-ranges beginning with a different initial digit to existing numbers started to be allocated. For example, in Sheffield (0114) when the 2xx xxxx numbers were exhausted, new numbers then began to be issued from the 3xx xxxx range. Similarly, newly allocated numbers in Leeds (0113), Leicester (0116) and Bristol (0117) also came from the 3xx xxxx range but, in Nottingham (0115), the new numbers instead came from the 8xx xxxx range. Less than a decade later, further new ranges were opened in most of these areas, but this time new Leicester numbers are in the 4xx xxxx range, new Bristol numbers are in the 2xx xxxx range, new Nottingham numbers are in the 7xx xxxx range and new Leeds numbers are in the 4xx xxxx and 8xx xxxx ranges.

City	Number range	Usage
Leeds
Leeds	(0113) 2xx xxxx	Numbers transferred from (0532) xxxxxx
Leeds	(0113) 3xx xxxx	New phase of numbers, issued from 1997
Leeds	(0113) 4xx xxxx	New phase of numbers, issued from 2010
Leeds	(0113) 8xx xxxx	New phase of numbers, issued from 2006
Sheffield
Sheffield	(0114) 2xx xxxx	Numbers transferred from (0742) xxxxxx
Sheffield	(0114) 3xx xxxx	New phase of numbers, issued from 2004
Sheffield	(0114) 4xx xxxx	New phase of numbers, issued from 2009
Nottingham
Nottingham	(0115) 2xx xxxx	New phase of numbers, issued from 2009
Nottingham	(0115) 7xx xxxx	New phase of numbers, issued from 2006
Nottingham	(0115) 8xx xxxx	New phase of numbers, issued from 1997
Nottingham	(0115) 9xx xxxx	Numbers transferred from (0602) xxxxxx
Leicester
Leicester	(0116) 2xx xxxx	Numbers transferred from (0533) xxxxxx
Leicester	(0116) 3xx xxxx	New phase of numbers, issued from 2004
Leicester	(0116) 4xx xxxx	New phase of numbers, issued from 2009
Bristol
Bristol	(0117) 2xx xxxx	New phase of numbers, issued from 2007
Bristol	(0117) 3xx xxxx	New phase of numbers, issued from 1997
Bristol	(0117) 4xx xxxx	New phase of numbers, issued from 2012
Bristol	(0117) 9xx xxxx	Numbers transferred from (0272) xxxxxx

After PhONEday, further changes to geographic area codes were made in Reading three years later and in London, Southampton, Portsmouth, Coventry, Cardiff and Northern Ireland at the Big Number Change five years later.

The changes made at PhONEday were one step towards reorganising the numbering plan at a later date, so that the first two digits would indicate the type of service called. PhONEday had cleared area codes from 02 to 09 of all geographic allocations by converting 9-digit numbers to 10-digit 01 numbers (and, in parts of at least 47 area codes, 8-digit numbers to 9-digit 01 numbers). After PhONEday, all pre-existing 9-digit mobile, non-geographic, premium rate, personal and pager numbers from 02 to 09 remained in place. Those would be moved to new 07, 08 and 09 prefixes and converted to 10-digits in the Big Number Change in 2000. However, from 1997 onwards, all new numbers for those services were allocated with 10-digits and already conforming to the new number plan: mobile phones (077xx, 078xx, 079xx), personal numbers (070), pagers (076), local-rate non-geographic revenue-share (0845), national-rate non-geographic revenue-share (0870) and premium rate (090x). Gaps were left within each of those new 10-digit number ranges to allow for the older 9-digit 02 to 09 numbers to migrate in the Big Number Change. Freephone numbers were an exception. Older 9-digit 0500 and 0800 numbers, as well as newer 10-digit 0800 and 0808 numbers, all remained in use after the Big Number Change.
