= FleXtel =

Telecommunications Company in Britain

Flextel Ltd
- Type: Private
- Industry: Telecommunications
- Founded: 1992, formerly as Goodall Personal Numbering
- Founder: William Goodall
- Headquarters: Sandbach, England, UK
- Products: Intelligent numbers, telecom services, VoIP & mobile services, personal numbers

Flextel is a British company that pioneered the use of personal numbering in telecommunications in the United Kingdom.

== Company history ==
In 1991, AT&T ran a trial which led in 1992 to the AT&T EasyReach 700 service of follow-me numbers, on area code 700 in the United States numbering plan. Stanford White – a former AT&T executive – brought this to the attention of Oftel.

=== Lobbying Oftel ===
After the Duopoly Review White Paper in 1991, it was clear that there was now an opportunity for small niche players in the UK telecoms market. There followed a protracted period of lobbying of Oftel by Stanford White (of Numbering Viewed Worldwide Ltd) along with William Goodall (of Goodall Personal Numbering Ltd, renamed Flextel Ltd in 1994). Finally, in mid-1993, each company was issued with a licence by the DTI (now BERR), under section 7 of the Telecommunications Act 1984, to provide telecommunications services. Together Stanford and William had effectively created the personal numbering market in the UK.

=== Company formation ===
In 1992, Flextel was formed by a team of management professionals, some of whom helped found and launch the Vodafone service. As a result of GSM roaming knowledge, Flextel was able to launch the UK's first commercial personal numbering service by December 1993, piggy-backed onto the Mercury One2One GSM network on the One2One 0956 7xxxxx range. Flextel was the only player in this challenging pre-market phase.

=== Personal numbering ===
In 1995, the UK telecoms regulator, Oftel (now Ofcom), reserved the whole of the 070 range exclusively for personal numbering, ensuring adequate number availability for the future. This move was fully supported by Flextel and, in June 1995, Flextel migrated its existing customers from 0956 7xxxxx to 070 107x xxxx numbers, the first UK personal number service in the specially designated 070 range. This was quickly followed by intense competition from a number of new personal numbering providers.

== Technological developments ==
In 2001, Flextel was first to launch the ability to reroute a personal number using SMS.

In 2002, Flextel deployed its own switches and real-time databases and gradually expanded its service proposition to non-geographic, mobile and geographic flexible telephone numbers.

After over 15 years, the market now has numerous service providers of virtual telephone numbers, each with a different package of advanced features, e.g. conference calling, fax to email, voicemail to email, area routing, time of day routing.
