= Voice short codes =

Type of telephone number in the UK

Voice short codes enable UK mobile phone users to dial a 5-digit short code (usually beginning 6, 7 or 8 - e.g. 61500) as an alternative to a standard geographic (e.g. 01 or 02 prefix) or non-geographic (e.g. 03, 08 or 09 prefix) long number. The consumer pays anything between 0p and £2 per call or per minute, with the call charge for any particular number being the same from all UK mobile providers. The short code is usually forwarded to a standard geographic number - typically an existing call centre or interactive voice response (IVR) system.

The use of non-geographic telephone numbers in the United Kingdom has been a major cause of bill shock. Pollster YouGov found that 49% of mobile users have been surprised to see how much they have been charged for calling 084, 087 and 09 non-geographic numbers and 90% believe organisations should make the cost of these calls clearer. According to Ofcom, UK consumers paid around £1.9 billion for calls to non-geographic numbers in 2009.

Following regulatory reform by Ofcom in 2015, call charges for numbers starting 084, 087, 090, 091, 098 and 118 were split into two parts: an Access Charge set by and paid to the benefit of the caller's telephone provider and a Service Charge set by and paid to the benefit of the called party and their telephone provider. Where TV shows offered both an 09 number and a shortcode number for contact, the call charge for the shortcode number is usually the same as the Service Charge element of the 09 call charge. The idea is for mobile callers to use the cheaper shortcode number and landline callers to use the 09 number.

Following their success in TV voting on shows like BBC's The Voice UK, voice short codes are now being used as an alternative to non-geographic numbers. Voice short codes enable businesses to provide greater transparency on call rates, as the rate is fixed irrespective of which network is being used to make the call.

Voice short codes are available across all the UK mobile network operators - namely Vodafone, 3, EE, Virgin Mobile and O2. Voice short codes are provided by mobile aggregators - who have a commercial relationship with each of the mobile operators.
