= MyOperator =

- Formerly: VoiceTree Technologies
- Type: Private
- Industry: Telecommunications
- Founded: June 2011, India
- Founder: Ankit Jain
- Headquarters: New Delhi, India
- Area served: India South Africa Germany Philippines Malaysia Singapore UAE UK Italy Australia Austria New Zealand Canada US
- Key people: CEO - Ankit Jain, COO - Pratik Jain
- Products: Office IVR, Cloud Call Center, Call Management System
- Brands: MyOperator
- Revenue: 14 crore
- Number of employees: 180+
- Website: https://myoperator.com

MyOperator is a cloud based telephony service provider company based in New Delhi, India. In 2011, Ankit Jain, a Birla Institute of Technology, Mesra (BIT Mesra) alumnus, founded the company. It uses Cloud Telephony to provide virtual and toll-free numbers to small and medium enterprises in India. Its patented technology enables a client to get a working cloud telephony account in 30 seconds.

It provided Aam Aadmi Party (AAP) a crowd sourced calling campaign which reached over 500,000 people in Delhi, before the 2013 Delhi Legislative Assembly election.

== History ==
MyOperator was started by Ankit Jain as VoiceTree Technologies, with a focus on rural voice-based infotainment mobile channels. It gained good call volume but failed to generate enough revenue. In March 2013, VoiceTree revived and MyOperator, a cloud-based call management system aimed at SMEs was launched.

== Awards ==
In 2014, NASSCOM identified VoiceTree Technologies as one of the Top 10 companies in the Emerge "League of 50" for 2014.
