= Non-geographic telephone numbers in the United Kingdom =

UK phone number not linked to a location

A non-geographic number is a type of telephone number that is not linked to any specific locality. Such numbers are an alternative to the traditional 'landline' numbers that are assigned geographically using a system of location-specific area codes. Non-geographic numbers are used for various reasons, from providing flexible routing of incoming phone calls to generating revenue for paid-for services.

== Functionality ==
Non-geographic numbers were introduced to offer services that were historically unavailable on standard landline phone numbers, particularly in terms of call routing and special charging arrangements. Advertised benefits of non-geographic numbers include:

- Call routing. Calls can be flexibly redirected to virtually any destination. For example, calls could be answered in different call centres depending on where the caller is located or the time of day.
- Ease of communication. Organisations covering multiple locations can advertise a single national phone number rather than having to publicise different numbers for different areas.
- Location neutrality. Standard geographic numbers are firmly linked with specific localities. Using non-geographic numbers can help an organisation avoid appearing to be limited in scope to a specific geographic area, and also removes any need to change telephone numbers in the event of relocation or expansion into a different area.
- Resilience and disaster recovery. Standard geographically routed landline numbers may become unreachable in the event of a fault or damage to the telephone network in the area they are linked to. Non-geographic numbers allow for incoming calls to be easily redirected to alternative locations when necessary.
- Special charging arrangements. The use of number prefixes that are distinct from standard landline numbers allows for a variety of different charging arrangements – from freephone numbers that cost the caller nothing to dial to premium rate numbers that generate revenue for the called party.

=== Call handling ===
Calls to non-geographic numbers are handled in various different ways by the telephone network. In the simplest case, calls are simply forwarded to a regular geographic number and routed by the telephone exchange in the normal way. In other cases, such numbers may channel calls directly to a company's private telephone system or VOIP service.

Developments in telecoms technology mean that advanced call routing facilities are no longer unique to non-geographic numbers with many suppliers offering the same functionality through 'virtual' geographic numbers.

=== Calling non-geographic numbers from abroad ===
Calling certain non-geographic number ranges might not be possible when calling from abroad of the United Kingdom. This is mostly the case with the 070 personal numbering range, the 080 freephone range and service numbers starting 084, 087, and 09.

== Non-geographic number ranges ==
All non-geographic numbers offer similar functionality, with the main difference being the charge levied on the caller. The major non-geographic prefixes now in use are:

=== 080 (freephone) ===
0800 and 0808 numbers are free-to-caller from landlines, mobile phones, and payphones alike. The organisation receiving the call pays the cost of the call.

=== 03 numbers ===
==== Billing and costs ====
Numbers starting with '03' are non-geographic numbers charged at standard geographic rates. Calls to these numbers cost exactly the same as calls to regular local or national landlines (those starting with 01 or 02). Regulation ensures that if a tariff offers inclusive minutes or free calls to numbers starting with 01 or 02, calls to 03 numbers must be included on exactly the same terms.

Since their reintroduction in 2007, (Note: 0345 xxxxxx numbers were first introduced in 1985, along with 0645 xxxxxx numbers, both designated as 'local rate' non-geographic calls at that time. Subsequently these numbers were changed to 0845 7xx xxxx and 0845 9xx xxxx in the Big Number Change of April 2001.) these 03 numbers have been the only variety of non-geographic number whose charge is officially linked to that of geographic numbers. No provision has been made for replicating the old 'local rate' or 'national rate' prefixes, as almost all UK telephone operators now charge all landline calls at the same rate, regardless of location.

==== Usage ====
As of 2016, active 03 number prefixes are: 0300, 0303, 0330, 0333, 0343, 0344, 0345, 0370, 0371, and 0372.

While all 03 numbers operate the same way, some sub-ranges have restrictions on their use.

030
Reserved for allocation to public sector bodies and not-for-profit bodies such as registered charities

034 / 037
Reserved for migration from equivalent 084 and 087 numbers.

=== Service numbers ===
These are the non-geographic numbers starting 084, 087, and 09. They are also known as premium rate numbers. Until 2015, 084 and 087 numbers were called special rate or business rate numbers.

Since 2015, these numbers have a two-part charging structure. Call charges consist of a per-minute access charge levied by the caller's phone service provider, plus a service charge or 'premium' paid to the joint benefit of the organisation being called and their telecoms provider.

The access charge varies considerably by phone operator, with calls from landlines charged at 2p to 27p per minute and calls from mobile phones charged at 4p to 89p per minute.

The service charge is charged at the same rate regardless of which telephone company the caller uses to make the call. The rate that applies must be detailed wherever the number is publicised and falls into the following bands:

- 084 numbers: up to 7p per call and/or 7p per minute
- 087 numbers: up to 13p per call and/or 13p per minute
- 09 numbers: up to £6.00 per call and/or £3.60 per minute.

There is no official central repository for Service Charge information, but the Federation of Communications Services (FCS) has provided an interactive online facility to look up the Service Charge for any 084, 087, 09, or 118 number.

==== Service charge price points ====
Upon introduction of the "unbundled tariff" for calls to 084, 087, 09, and 118 numbers on 1 July 2015 there were 80 price points for the Service Charge element of the call cost. These were designated SC001 to SC080. A further 20 price points, designated SC081 to SC100, were added on 1 July 2016. There were 100 price points until 1 April 2019. The same charges apply to calls made from all landline and mobile providers.

Zen Internet charged six of the price points at the wrong rate, three from 1 July 2015 until their withdrawal on 1 April 2019 and three more from 1 July 2016 to January 2019. From 1 July 2016 to 26 December 2016, Sky Talk charged three of the Service Charge price points at the wrong rate. From 30 November 2016 to 14 March 2017, Sky Mobile charged three of the price points at the wrong rate. Virgin Media did not list price points SC081 to SC100. Andrews & Arnold did not list price points SC068 to SC072, SC080 or SC081 to SC100. Origin Broadband did not list price points SC081 to SC100.

On 1 April 2019, Ofcom introduced a price cap (on the Service Charge element of the call cost) of £3.65 per 90 seconds of a call on calls to numbers starting 118. From this date, 26 of the existing 100 Service Charge price points were no longer available for use by services on telephone numbers starting 118. Of those 26 price points, some 15 price points were available only for use by services on numbers starting 09, and eleven price points were withdrawn from use. From 1 May 2019, new price points started to be introduced. These re-used some of the previously withdrawn SC code numbers – all as noted in the table below.

Description	Service Charge rate		Charge Band (starting dates)				Numbers starting
Description	Per call	Per minute	1 July 2015	1 July 2016	1 April 2019	1 May 2019	Numbers starting
Calls with a zero-rated Service Charge	–	–	SC001	SC001	SC001	SC001	084, 087, 09, 118
Calls with a per-call rated Service Charge	£0.05	–	SC046	SC046	SC046	SC046	084, 087, 09, 118
Calls with a per-call rated Service Charge	£0.10	–	SC047	SC047	SC047	SC047	087, 09, 118
Calls with a per-call rated Service Charge	£0.15	–	SC048	SC048	SC048	SC048	09, 118
Calls with a per-call rated Service Charge	£0.25	–	SC049	SC049	SC049	SC049	09, 118
Calls with a per-call rated Service Charge	£0.30	–	SC050	SC050	SC050	SC050	09, 118
Calls with a per-call rated Service Charge	£0.35	–	SC051	SC051	SC051	SC051	09, 118
Calls with a per-call rated Service Charge	£0.40	–	SC052	SC052	SC052	SC052	09, 118
Calls with a per-call rated Service Charge	£0.48	–	SC053	SC053	SC053	SC053	09, 118
Calls with a per-call rated Service Charge	£0.50	–	SC054	SC054	SC054	SC054	09, 118
Calls with a per-call rated Service Charge	£0.70	–	SC055	SC055	SC055	SC055	09, 118
Calls with a per-call rated Service Charge	£0.75	–	SC056	SC056	SC056	SC056	09, 118
Calls with a per-call rated Service Charge	£1.00	–	SC057	SC057	SC057	SC057	09, 118
Calls with a per-call rated Service Charge	£1.45	–	SC058	SC058	SC058	SC058	09, 118
Calls with a per-call rated Service Charge	£1.50	–	SC059	SC059	SC059	SC059	09, 118
Calls with a per-call rated Service Charge	£2.00	–	SC060	SC060	SC060	SC060	09, 118
Calls with a per-call rated Service Charge	£2.50	–	SC061	SC061	SC061	SC061	09, 118
Calls with a per-call rated Service Charge	£3.00	–	SC062	SC062	SC062	SC062	09, 118
Calls with a per-call rated Service Charge	£3.65	–				SC088 (Note: New price point introduced from 1 July 2019.)	09, 118
Calls with a per-call rated Service Charge	£4.00	–	SC063	SC063	SC063 (Note: From 1 April 2019 this price point is no longer allowed to be used for numbers starting 118.)	SC063	09, ~~118~~
Calls with a per-call rated Service Charge	£5.00	–	SC064	SC064	SC064	SC064	09, ~~118~~
Calls with a per-call rated Service Charge	£6.00	–	SC065	SC065	SC065	SC065	09, ~~118~~
Calls with a per-minute rated Service Charge	–	£0.01	SC002	SC002	SC002	SC002	084, 087, 09, 118
Calls with a per-minute rated Service Charge	–	£0.02	SC003	SC003	SC003	SC003	084, 087, 09, 118
Calls with a per-minute rated Service Charge	–	£0.03	SC004	SC004	SC004	SC004	084, 087, 09, 118
Calls with a per-minute rated Service Charge	–	£0.04	SC005	SC005	SC005	SC005	084, 087, 09, 118
Calls with a per-minute rated Service Charge	–	£0.05	SC006	SC006	SC006	SC006	084, 087, 09, 118
Calls with a per-minute rated Service Charge	–	£0.06	SC007	SC007	SC007	SC007	084, 087, 09, 118
Calls with a per-minute rated Service Charge	–	£0.07	SC008	SC008	SC008	SC008	084, 087, 09, 118
Calls with a per-minute rated Service Charge	–	£0.08	SC009	SC009	SC009	SC009	087, 09, 118
Calls with a per-minute rated Service Charge	–	£0.09	SC010	SC010	SC010	SC010	087, 09, 118
Calls with a per-minute rated Service Charge	–	£0.10	SC011	SC011	SC011	SC011	087, 09, 118
Calls with a per-minute rated Service Charge	–	£0.11	SC012	SC012	SC012	SC012	087, 09, 118
Calls with a per-minute rated Service Charge	–	£0.12	SC013	SC013	SC013	SC013	087, 09, 118
Calls with a per-minute rated Service Charge	–	£0.13	SC014	SC014	SC014	SC014	087, 09, 118
Calls with a per-minute rated Service Charge	–	£0.15	SC015	SC015	SC015	SC015	09, 118
Calls with a per-minute rated Service Charge	–	£0.18		SC081 (Note: From 1 July 2016 to 26 December 2016, Sky Talk charged this price point as 18p per call.) (Note: From 30 November 2016 to 14 March 2017, Sky Mobile charged this price point as 18p per call.)	SC081	SC081	09, 118
Calls with a per-minute rated Service Charge	–	£0.20	SC016	SC016	SC016	SC016	09, 118
Calls with a per-minute rated Service Charge	–	£0.22		SC082 (Note: From 1 July 2016 to 26 December 2016, Sky Talk charged this price point as 22p per call.) (Note: From 30 November 2016 to 14 March 2017, Sky Mobile charged this price point as 22p per call.)	SC082	SC082	09, 118
Calls with a per-minute rated Service Charge	–	£0.25	SC017	SC017	SC017	SC017	09, 118
Calls with a per-minute rated Service Charge	–	£0.30	SC018	SC018	SC018	SC018	09, 118
Calls with a per-minute rated Service Charge	–	£0.35	SC019	SC019	SC019	SC019	09, 118
Calls with a per-minute rated Service Charge	–	£0.36	SC020	SC020	SC020	SC020	09, 118
Calls with a per-minute rated Service Charge	–	£0.40	SC021	SC021	SC021	SC021	09, 118
Calls with a per-minute rated Service Charge	–	£0.45	SC022	SC022	SC022	SC022	09, 118
Calls with a per-minute rated Service Charge	–	£0.46	SC023	SC023	SC023	SC023	09, 118
Calls with a per-minute rated Service Charge	–	£0.50	SC024	SC024	SC024	SC024	09, 118
Calls with a per-minute rated Service Charge	–	£0.55	SC025	SC025	SC025	SC025	09, 118
Calls with a per-minute rated Service Charge	–	£0.60	SC026	SC026	SC026	SC026	09, 118
Calls with a per-minute rated Service Charge	–	£0.65	SC027	SC027	SC027	SC027	09, 118
Calls with a per-minute rated Service Charge	–	£0.70	SC028	SC028	SC028	SC028	09, 118
Calls with a per-minute rated Service Charge	–	£0.75	SC029	SC029	SC029	SC029	09, 118
Calls with a per-minute rated Service Charge	–	£0.80	SC030	SC030	SC030	SC030	09, 118
Calls with a per-minute rated Service Charge	–	£0.90	SC031	SC031	SC031	SC031	09, 118
Calls with a per-minute rated Service Charge	–	£0.95	SC032	SC032	SC032	SC032	09, 118
Calls with a per-minute rated Service Charge	–	£0.99	SC033	SC033	SC033	SC033	09, 118
Calls with a per-minute rated Service Charge	–	£1.00	SC034	SC034	SC034	SC034	09, 118
Calls with a per-minute rated Service Charge	–	£1.10	SC035	SC035	SC035	SC035	09, 118
Calls with a per-minute rated Service Charge	–	£1.20	SC036	SC036	SC036	SC036	09, 118
Calls with a per-minute rated Service Charge	–	£1.45	SC037	SC037	SC037	SC037	09, 118
Calls with a per-minute rated Service Charge	–	£1.50	SC038	SC038	SC038	SC038	09, 118
Calls with a per-minute rated Service Charge	–	£1.55	SC039	SC039	SC039	SC039	09, 118
Calls with a per-minute rated Service Charge	–	£1.80	SC040	SC040	SC040	SC040	09, 118
Calls with a per-minute rated Service Charge	–	£2.00	SC041	SC041	SC041	SC041	09, 118
Calls with a per-minute rated Service Charge	–	£2.20	SC042	SC042	SC042	SC042	09, 118
Calls with a per-minute rated Service Charge	–	£2.43				SC068	09, 118
Calls with a per-minute rated Service Charge	–	£2.50	SC043	SC043	SC043	SC043	09, ~~118~~
Calls with a per-minute rated Service Charge	–	£3.00	SC044	SC044	SC044	SC044	09, ~~118~~
Calls with a per-minute rated Service Charge	–	£3.50		SC083 (Note: From 1 July 2016 to 26 December 2016, Sky Talk charged this price point as £3.50 per call.) (Note: From 30 November 2016 to 14 March 2017, Sky Mobile charged this price point as £3.50 per call.) (Note: From 1 July 2016 to January 2019, Zen Internet charged this price point as £3.60 per minute.)	SC083	SC083	09, ~~118~~
Calls with a per-minute rated Service Charge	–	£3.60	SC045	SC045	SC045	SC045	09, ~~118~~
Calls with a per-call plus per-minute rated Service Charge (both charges apply from start of call)	£0.77	£1.55	SC066	SC066	SC066	SC066	09, 118
Calls with a per-call plus per-minute rated Service Charge (both charges apply from start of call)	£0.80	£0.25	SC067	SC067	SC067	SC067	09, 118
Calls with a per-call plus per-minute rated Service Charge (both charges apply from start of call)	£2.50	£0.75		SC084	SC084	SC084	09, 118
Calls with a per-call plus per-minute rated Service Charge (both charges apply from start of call)	£2.60	£0.99		SC085	SC085	SC085	09, ~~118~~
Calls with a per-call plus per-minute rated Service Charge (both charges apply from start of call)	£2.75	£0.78		SC086 (Note: From 1 July 2016 to January 2019, Zen Internet charged this price point as 78p per call plus 78p per minute.)	SC086	SC086	09, ~~118~~
Calls with a per-call plus per-minute rated Service Charge (both charges apply from start of call)	£3.50	£0.10				SC069 (Note: New price point introduced from 1 May 2019.)	09, 118
Calls with a per-call plus per-minute rated Service Charge (both charges apply from start of call)	£3.99	£1.39	SC068	SC068	withdrawn		~~118~~
Calls with a per-call plus per-minute rated Service Charge (both charges apply from start of call)	£4.99	£1.35	SC069	SC069	withdrawn		~~118~~
Calls with a per-call plus per-minute rated Service Charge (per-minute charge applies after first 60 seconds)	£0.05	£0.05	SC074	SC074	SC074	SC074	084, 087, 09, 118
Calls with a per-call plus per-minute rated Service Charge (per-minute charge applies after first 60 seconds)	£0.07	£0.07		SC092	SC092	SC092	084, 087, 09, 118
Calls with a per-call plus per-minute rated Service Charge (per-minute charge applies after first 60 seconds)	£0.10	£0.10	SC075	SC075	SC075	SC075	087, 09, 118
Calls with a per-call plus per-minute rated Service Charge (per-minute charge applies after first 60 seconds)	£0.13	£0.13		SC093 (Note: From 1 July 2016 to January 2019, Zen Internet charged this price point as 1p per call plus 13p per minute.)	SC093	SC093	087, 09, 118
Calls with a per-call plus per-minute rated Service Charge (per-minute charge applies after first 60 seconds)	£0.40	£0.40	SC076	SC076	SC076	SC076	09, 118
Calls with a per-call plus per-minute rated Service Charge (per-minute charge applies after first 60 seconds)	£0.70	£0.70	SC077	SC077	SC077	SC077	09, 118
Calls with a per-call plus per-minute rated Service Charge (per-minute charge applies after first 60 seconds)	£0.80	£0.80		SC094	SC094	SC094	09, 118
Calls with a per-call plus per-minute rated Service Charge (per-minute charge applies after first 60 seconds)	£1.00	£1.00		SC095	SC095	SC095	09, 118
Calls with a per-call plus per-minute rated Service Charge (per-minute charge applies after first 60 seconds)	£1.50	£1.50	SC078	SC078	SC078	SC078	09, 118
Calls with a per-call plus per-minute rated Service Charge (per-minute charge applies after first 60 seconds)	£2.00	£2.00	SC079	SC079	SC079	SC079	09, 118
Calls with a per-call plus per-minute rated Service Charge (per-minute charge applies after first 60 seconds)	£2.43	£2.43				SC070	09, 118
Calls with a per-call plus per-minute rated Service Charge (per-minute charge applies after first 60 seconds)	£2.60	£2.10				SC071 (Note: New price point introduced from 1 August 2019.)	09, 118
Calls with a per-call plus per-minute rated Service Charge (per-minute charge applies after first 60 seconds)	£2.76	£1.77				SC072	09, 118
Calls with a per-call plus per-minute rated Service Charge (per-minute charge applies after first 60 seconds)	£3.00	£1.30				SC087	09, 118
Calls with a per-call plus per-minute rated Service Charge (per-minute charge applies after first 60 seconds)	£3.00	£3.00		SC096	SC096	SC096	09, ~~118~~
Calls with a per-call plus per-minute rated Service Charge (per-minute charge applies after first 60 seconds)	£3.60	£0.50		SC097	SC097	SC097	09, ~~118~~
Calls with a per-call plus per-minute rated Service Charge (per-minute charge applies after first 60 seconds)	£3.60	£1.50		SC098	SC098	SC098	09, ~~118~~
Calls with a per-call plus per-minute rated Service Charge (per-minute charge applies after first 60 seconds)	£3.60	£2.00		SC099	SC099	SC099	09, ~~118~~
Calls with a per-call plus per-minute rated Service Charge (per-minute charge applies after first 60 seconds)	£3.60	£3.60		SC100	SC100	SC100	09, ~~118~~
Calls with a per-call plus per-minute rated Service Charge (per-minute charge applies after first 60 seconds)	£4.45	£2.57	SC080	SC080	withdrawn		~~118~~
Calls with a per-call plus per-minute rated Service Charge (per-minute charge applies after first 60 seconds)	£5.50	£2.75	SC070 (Note: From 1 July 2015, Zen Internet has charged the per-minute element from start of the call.)	SC070	withdrawn		~~118~~
Calls with a per-call plus per-minute rated Service Charge (per-minute charge applies after first 60 seconds)	£5.74	£2.99	SC071	SC071	withdrawn		~~118~~
Calls with a per-call plus per-minute rated Service Charge (per-minute charge applies after first 60 seconds)	£6.98	£3.49	SC072	SC072	withdrawn		~~118~~
Calls with a per-call plus per-minute rated Service Charge (per-minute charge applies after first 60 seconds)	£8.98	£4.49		SC087	withdrawn		~~118~~
Calls with a per-call plus per-minute rated Service Charge (per-minute charge applies after first 60 seconds)	£9.98	£4.99		SC088	withdrawn		~~118~~
Calls with a per-call plus per-minute rated Service Charge (per-minute charge applies after first 60 seconds)	£11.98	£5.99		SC089	withdrawn		~~118~~
Calls with a per-call plus per-minute rated Service Charge (per-minute charge applies after first 60 seconds)	£13.98	£6.99		SC090	withdrawn		~~118~~
Calls with a per-call plus per-minute rated Service Charge (per-minute charge applies after first 60 seconds)	£15.98	£7.99		SC091	withdrawn		~~118~~
Calls with a zero-rated Service Charge for the first minute plus a per-minute rated Service Charge after the first 60 seconds	–	£2.50	SC073	SC073	SC073	SC073	09, ~~118~~
Price point undefined	–	–			SC068		n/a
Price point undefined	–	–			SC069		n/a
Price point undefined	–	–			SC080	SC080	n/a
Price point undefined	–	–			SC070		n/a
Price point undefined	–	–			SC071		n/a
Price point undefined	–	–			SC072		n/a
Price point undefined	–	–			SC087		n/a
Price point undefined	–	–			SC088		n/a
Price point undefined	–	–			SC089	SC089	n/a
Price point undefined	–	–			SC090	SC090	n/a
Price point undefined	–	–			SC091	SC091	n/a

=== Personal numbers ===
Numbers starting 070 are "personal numbers" – virtual telephone numbers intended to offer non-geographic number functionality to individuals, such as by allowing people to have a single number that directs calls to their home, work or mobile phone as they choose. They are controversial as they are charged at premium rates and can be confused for mobile numbers, and therefore the cost of calls to them may not be apparent to callers until they receive their bills.

From 1 October 2019, Ofcom capped the termination rate for these calls at the same rate as for calls to UK mobile numbers, thereby allowing phone providers to include these calls within monthly allowances or otherwise charge them at the same rate as a call to a mobile number.

=== Controlled Premium Rate Services ===
A subset of non-geographic numbers, designated Controlled Premium Rate Services (CPRS), is subject to additional regulation by the Phone-paid Services Authority (PSA), formerly PhonepayPlus.

Ofcom's "PRS Condition" defines Controlled Premium Rate Services as those:

- using "unbundled tariff numbers" starting 087, 090, 091, 098 or 118 with a Service Charge of more than 7p per call or per minute inclusive of VAT,
- using other numbers where the termination fee or rate is more than 10p per call or per minute inclusive of VAT (covers numbers starting 070 and 076 and various mobile shortcodes),
- providing a chatline service, irrespective of call cost or prefix used,
- providing an adult-entertainment service, irrespective of call cost or prefix used,
- is an internet dialler-operated service, irrespective of call cost or prefix used.

From 16 January 2019, all Information, Connection and/or Sign-posting Services (ICSS), irrespective of call cost or prefix used, were added to this definition.

Services identified as CPRS must comply with the PSA Code of Practice.

== History ==
Most non-geographic numbers use prefixes recovered from former use as geographic area codes. For previous uses of prefixes such as 0345, 0800 and 0990, see: List of dialling codes in the United Kingdom.

=== Freephone – including 0800 and 0808 ===
During the 1980s, free-to-caller numbers were introduced using a range of prefixes that had previously been used as geographic area codes. By the 1990s, the prefixes 0321, 0500 and 0800 were all in use and allocated to Vodafone, Mercury Communications and BT respectively. Typically, the relevant prefix was followed by a six-digit number, giving a total number length of ten digits including the initial '0'.

Increased competition and a shortage of the popular 0800 numbers in the early 1990s saw various strategies employed to increase freephone capacity. Newly issued 0800 numbers were lengthened to include seven digits after the 0800 prefix, and the additional 0808 prefix was introduced during 1997. Also during the 1990s, deregulation allowed companies other than BT to acquire 0800 numbers and issue them to their customers, as well as allowing customers with existing freephone numbers to retain them when changing telecoms supplier.

With the 0800 and 0808 ranges established as the primary freephone ranges, the 0321 number range was withdrawn during 2001. The 0500 number range will be withdrawn during 2017, with users migrated to 0808 5 numbers.

Major mobile phone operators went through a period of charging callers to dial most freephone numbers from around 2005 onwards – but this practice largely ceased on 1 July 2015 as 0800 and 0808 numbers became universally free to call from mobiles and landlines due to changes in Ofcom legislation.

As a freephone call results in no charge to the caller, the organisation receiving the call pays the call cost.

=== 03 Numbers ===
The original range of telephone numbers starting '03' was progressively cleared between 1995 and 2001: former geographic area codes starting 03 were renumbered to start 013 during the national PhONEday renumbering, while premium rate, local rate and mobile phone prefixes such as 0331, 0345, and 0378 were transferred to a simplified structure of 09, 08 and 07 numbers. The 03 numbering range was then designated as available for any new geographic area codes that might be created during further renumbering.

With no further geographic renumbering undertaken, the 03 numbering range was no longer required for its original purpose and was instead redesignated for "non-geographic numbers charged at geographic rate" service in 2006. Telecoms regulator Ofcom introduced the range as it believed that some organisations would benefit from a type of non-geographic number that did not impose any additional charges on callers, and that some consumers were confused about charges for existing special-rate numbers starting 084 and 087.

The decision to introduce the new 03 range followed a period in which increased competition in the telecoms market had brought considerable change to the way in which calls were charged for. When first introduced in the 1980s, special 'local rate' and 'national rate' non-geographic prefixes (such as 0345, 0645 and 0990) had been charged at exactly the same rate as normal local and national geographic calls. Telecoms deregulation saw several more landline providers enter the market and call packages with "inclusive" minutes to 01 and 02 numbers started to become the standard offering after 1999. While BT's charges for calls to non-geographic numbers were capped, most call packages did not include calls to non-geographic numbers, and other landline providers and mobile operators were free to charge whatever they liked for these calls. In time, a situation developed where supposedly 'local' and 'national' rate prefixes (which by 2001 had been renumbered to begin 0845 or 0870) frequently cost more to call than a genuine local or national landline. By 2004, the situation had become even more complicated as most telephone companies abandoned any distinction between local and national rate calls and began charging geographic landline numbers at a single rate. The new 03 number range had none of these ambiguities or complications and allowed organisations to once again advertise non-geographic numbers that were consistently priced and did not result in callers paying a premium.

=== Service Numbers starting 084 ===
After the national PhONEday renumbering in 1995, the first new use of numbers starting 084 was in 1996 when 0845 numbers were introduced for non-geographic services charged at a local rate. These 0845 numbers joined, and eventually replaced, existing local rate prefixes 0345 and 0645 which had been introduced in the 1980s. Telephone companies originally charged these calls at the same rate as local geographic calls.

In 1999, landline providers started to offer "inclusive" call packages where calls to all 01 and 02 numbers are free. However, outside the plan there was no price distinction between local or national calls. In 2004, telecoms companies scrapped the remaining tariffs that had provided a discount for local geographic calls. With this change, "local rate" ceased to exist for all customers. Prices for calling 0845 numbers remained roughly the same as before, but since 2004 the UK Advertising Standards Authority has ruled against every company describing them as "local rate" or "lo-call" numbers. Some operators began to include 0845 numbers in their calling plans, but others – including mobile operators – did not.

In 2000, the 0844 prefix was introduced for use with dial-up internet services (in the range 0844 0xx xxxx) and for general uses charged at a rate of up to 5p per minute (all other 0844 numbers). The 0843 prefix was added to provide additional capacity in 2007. These numbers were never linked to geographic call rate and were never included in call plans; the Advertising Standards Authority has taken action against companies that falsely claim 084 numbers are "local rate" or "lo-call" rate calls.

Prices from BT lines were regulated such that calls to 0843 and 0844 numbers typically cost no more than 5p per minute. However, such calls were not included in calling packages and other landline companies and mobile operators charged a far wider range of prices, typically up to 40p per minute. This charging structure allowed organisations to benefit financially from calls to such numbers, by receiving a percentage of the charge made to the caller.

On 1 July 2015, a simplified universal charging system was introduced for 084 numbers and all other 'service numbers'. Calls to all 084 numbers now consist of a 'service charge' of up to 7p per minute and/or 7p per call, plus a standard 'access charge' set by the caller's own phone company which typically ranges from 7p to 45p per minute. The total call cost therefore typically ranges from 7p to 52p per minute.

The service charge is the portion of the call cost that is received by the organisation being called and/or their number supplier; a variety of different per-minute and per-call rates are available. Organisations are obliged to detail the applicable service charge wherever they publicise their 084 number.

=== Service Numbers starting 087 ===
The first new 087 numbering range introduced after the PhONEday renumbering of 1995 was the 0870 prefix. Introduced in 1996, this was for non-geographic calls charged at the same rate as national (or 'long distance') calls. It initially existed alongside the older 0541 and 0990 prefixes, before finally replacing them entirely in 2001.

In 2000, a further batch of numbers using the prefix 0871 was introduced for use with dial-up internet services (in the range 0871 0xx xxxx) and for general uses charged at a rate of up to 10p per minute (all other 0871 numbers). In 2007, the 0872 and 0873 prefixes were added to provide additional capacity. In contrast to the 0870 range, neither prefix was linked to geographic rates or included in call packages, with both 0871 and 0872 numbers instead intended to be charged at a typical rate of no more than 10p per minute. In practice, such charging rates applied only from BT lines and calls typically cost 16p per minute from non-BT landlines and up to 45p per minute from mobile telephones.

In 1999, landline providers started to offer "inclusive" call packages where calls to 01 and 02 numbers were free. Within a few years most customers were on this type of plan. The price for calling 0870 numbers continued at roughly the same levels as before – and as they were not usually included in calling packages or free minutes, they effectively became more expensive to call than regular geographic numbers in most cases. Mobile operators also began to charge a higher rate for 0870 calls than for geographic numbers. As a result, the term "national rate" was no longer an accurate description of the price for calling 0870 numbers. The Advertising Standards Authority made several rulings against companies claiming that their 0870 numbers were charged at national rates over the following years.

As with 084 numbers, the charging structure allowed organisations to benefit financially from calls to such numbers, by receiving a percentage of the charge made to the caller.

As 0870 numbers had been adopted on a large scale by public services, healthcare providers, banks, utilities and other companies, the relatively high cost of calling such numbers became a matter of public concern. By 2004, the website saynoto0870.com had been established to help callers find alternative contact numbers for companies, and in 2005 BT suggested scrapping 0845 and 0870 numbers entirely. BT believed the public were being misled about their call prices from other operators and Ofcom proposed removing revenue share from 0870 numbers and capping prices at less than "national rate" – but such changes were delayed by several years.

In response to concerns about the continuing abuse of 0870 numbers, Ofcom announced in 2008 that higher charges for 0870 numbers could remain provided that there was an announcement before the call. However, since that announcement Ofcom changed its decision, citing technical difficulties relating to alarm systems, some of which are life critical and due to strong lobbying and pressure from the telecoms industry. From 2009, the ability of organisations using 0870 numbers to receive a proportion of the call cost was removed. However, the cost of calling such numbers continued to vary considerably; some landline tariffs now included 0870 numbers in inclusive allowances, while mobile operators charged a premium for calling such numbers. Many organisations changed to using other 084 and 087 numbers through which they could continue to receive an income from call costs.

From 2008, the higher-rate 0871 and 0872 numbers began being regulated by the premium-rate telecoms regulator, PhonepayPlus.

On 1 July 2015, a simplified universal charging system was introduced for 087 numbers and all other 'service numbers'. Calls to all 087 numbers now consist of a 'service charge' of up to 13p per minute and/or 13p per call, plus a standard 'access charge' set by the caller's own phone company which typically ranges from 7p to 45p per minute. The total call cost therefore typically ranges from 7p to 58p per minute.

The service charge is the portion of the call cost that is received by the organisation being called and/or their number supplier; a variety of different per-minute and per-call rates are available. Organisations are obliged to detail the applicable service charge wherever they publicise their 087 number.

=== Service Numbers starting 09 ===
During the 1980s and early 1990s, a range of premium rate prefixes were brought into use for a variety of purposes including competitions, recorded information, chat lines and television voting. The BT prefixes 0891 and 0898 became well-known, but a wide variety of other prefixes were also used including 0338, 0660, 0890 and 0991.

From July 1998, numbers starting with 090 were progressively made available for all new premium-rate services. Initially, these were further subdivided by type: 0909 was for adult services, while 0907 was intended to be used as a pay-for-product range.

A year later, on 1 July 1999, the promotion of services using older premium rate prefixes not starting with 090 was prohibited. Finally, in April 2001, all such numbers were permanently withdrawn.

Various new premium rate prefixes starting 090 and 091 have come into use in the years since and Ofcom has now set aside the whole of the 09 number range for use by premium-rate services. The block of numbers starting 098 is reserved for adult services with sexual content (alongside older 0908 and 0909 prefixes).

As with 084 and 087 numbers, a simplified two-part charging scheme was adopted for 09 numbers on 1 July 2015.

== Revenue Sharing and Call Price Indications ==
The cost of calling non-geographic numbers starting with 084, 087 and 09 usually includes a 'service charge' which allows for the possibility of what is known as revenue sharing.

For any telephone call to a non-geographic number, there are four parties involved: the caller, the originating telecommunications company (or 'telco'), the terminating telco and the called party. The caller pays their telephone bill to the originating telco.

The called party is supplied their non-geographic telephone number by the terminating telco, which will have issued with specific blocks of non-geographic numbers by Ofcom. Each block will have a specific service charge associated with it – for example, numbers starting 0845 748 are BT numbers with a 5p per minute service charge, while those beginning 0871 484 are numbers operated by TTNC Ltd. with a service charge of 10p per call. The called party has complete control over this choice when they pick a telephone number for their business from the available supply.

After covering the cost of routing the call to its final destination, the terminating telco may share some of the remaining "premium" directly with the called party in a revenue share arrangement, or may use those monies to offset the cost of providing other services for the called party.

Revenue sharing is not possible on 0800 and 0808 number ranges due to their free-to-caller nature, and is specifically prohibited for 03 numbers.

=== Call price indications ===
The total charges for calls to 084, 087 and 09 numbers consists of two distinct parts, which are intended to be communicated to callers separately:

- The called party is responsible for informing callers of the 'service charge' they and/or the terminating telco will receive;
- The originating telco is responsible for informing its customers of the standard per-minute 'access charge' they levy on calls to 084, 087 and 09 numbers.

Previously, the called party was obligated to quote only the call price from BT landlines. For example, for 0844 numbers they would typically state: "calls cost 5 pence per minute from a BT landline, other providers and mobile operators may charge more." As other landline providers and mobile operators often charged significantly more than the tightly regulated BT amount, there was considerable potential for bill shock and confusion.

The called party would now be expected to include a statement such as: "calls cost 7p/min, plus your telephone company's access charge". This removes the ambiguity of the phrase "may charge more" and makes it clear where organisations are choosing to impose a service charge on callers – but does rely on callers being aware of their call provider's access charge to calculate the total price.

== Usage of non-geographic numbers and popular opposition ==
Different prefixes have different costs for both the user and caller. Where the call is completely free to the caller (rather than simply inclusive within an allowance) the user pays extra to cover the costs not met by the caller. However, most non-geographic prefixes charge the caller extra and this "premium" or "enhanced termination rate" is passed on to the terminating telecoms company to pay for call routing to the final destination with any excess being paid out to the called party in a "revenue share" arrangement. Hundreds of UK companies offer NGNs for sale or rent. Some also offer switchboard and call centre equipment in a package deal where some of the revenue derived from calls subsidises those costs.

While all 084, 087 (except 0870) and 09 numbers charge a "premium" to the caller, numbers starting 0871, 0872, 0873, 090, 091 and 098 are covered by additional Premium Rate Services (PRS) regulation, generally have the highest costs, and are heavily regulated by the Phone-paid Services Authority. New "adult" services (SES) must use 098; legacy 0908 and 0909 numbers also carry these services.

With the increased price differential, the use of non-geographic telephone numbers in the United Kingdom has been a major cause of bill shock. Pollster YouGov found that 49% of mobile users have been surprised to see how much they have been charged for calling non-geographic numbers and 90% believe organisations should make the cost of these calls clearer. According to Ofcom, UK consumers paid around £1.9 billion for calls to non-geographic numbers in 2009.

Clients are attracted to 084 and 087 numbers because per minute revenue is generated for them from each call, and call queuing is permitted. Call centres may generate very high revenue from high call volumes. Questions have been asked in the British House of Commons about how much money the UK government is receiving from call queuing on non-geographic numbers.

There is increasing consumer opposition to non-geographic numbers. This is partly due to revenue sharing concerns and partly due to these calls not being eligible for use within inclusive minutes. Whilst a national or regional business may want a single contact number that is not tied to a location, there seems little sense in a small trader covering a town, or at most a county, having a non-geographic number for their single telephone line. Businesses are attracted to using 084 numbers as many of the sellers of NGNs assert that callers are paying only a "local rate" call.

Consumers are aware that they are being charged for time spent waiting for their call to be answered. (Even more of the public is aware of the huge costs of 09 Premium rate numbers, where prices have to be clearly indicated, and on which call queuing is specifically prohibited.) There has been increasing media coverage which has raised awareness of this.

During debates in the House of Commons, a number of Members of Parliament have criticised the use of 0845 numbers to provide access to government services, such as at the Department for Work and Pensions (DWP). It is objected that taxpayers are already financing government services via taxation, and in the specific case of DWP that many callers are benefit claimants without much money. The DWP is in the process of migrating from 0845 numbers to 0800 or 03 numbers. The Department of Health undertook a public consultation on banning 084 numbers in NHS services and amended GP contracts in 2010 to ban their use.

Some consumers have tried to avoid calling non-geographic numbers by instead calling a non-advertised geographic number. Geographic rate alternatives to chargeable non-geographic numbers can often be found through simple online searches on web sites such as saynoto0870.com.

In June 2014, the Consumer Rights Directive will make it illegal to use "numbers that cost more than the basic rate" for customer services and complaints. Many current users of 084 and 087 numbers will have to move to their 034 and 037 equivalents or to 01 or 02 geographic numbers or to new 030, 033 or 080 non-geographic numbers.

Following their success in TV voting on shows like BBC One's The Voice UK, voice short codes are now being used as an alternative to non-geographic numbers. Voice short codes enable businesses to provide greater transparency on call rates, as the rate is fixed irrespective of which network is being used to make the call.

=== Healthcare ===
Due to concerns raised by patients having to pay unfair costs when calling NHS services by telephone, the usage of 0870 non-geographic numbers was banned by the Department of Health in 2005. At that time, 0870 numbers often cost more to call than geographic 01 and 02 numbers and were not usually included in bundled minutes. Around 400 GP surgeries used 0870 numbers and were also coming under greater scrutiny with a few reverting to geographic numbers.

Many of these services quickly moved to 0845 or 0844 revenue share numbers as they were not specifically banned, even though they also cost more to call than 01 and 02 numbers and in many cases cost more to call than 0870 numbers. The tendency to unlawfully refer to 084x numbers as 'local rate' or 'lo-call' numbers hid the true cost of calling them, compared to the price for calling geographic numbers. One supplier of surgery telephone systems opted to use 0844 revenue share numbers paying the surgery 2p/min from the 5p/min "premium" paid by callers. Contravening ASA advice, surgeries were told that 0844 numbers were "lo-call" numbers and subsequent tariff comparisons ignored both packages with inclusive minutes and users with mobile phones.

In December 2006, Lord Norman Warner sent a letter to all primary care trust chief executives drawing attention to the Central Office of Information guidance on telephone numbering, which suggested that healthcare providers consider adopting an 03 telephone number so that people "do not have to pay over the odds to contact their local services". Very few took notice. In July and November 2007, two early day motions were signed by numerous MPs calling for GPs to no longer use 0844 and other such expensive telephone numbers.

In recent years, there has been much discussion in the media about the use of 0844 numbers in the healthcare sector, mainly due to the costs incurred by people who have to dial these numbers as the primary form of contact with their local healthcare services, especially when calling from mobiles.

The issue was debated in Parliament in early 2008. The BMA recommended that GPs publish call costs for 0844 numbers in surgeries. Former Health Secretary Alan Johnson has publicly advocated the use of 03 numbers. By early 2008 there were already more than 800 GPs in England using 0844 telephone numbers.

The Department of Health started investigating the use of 084 numbers in the NHS in March 2008 Phone supplier NEG stated their belief that 0844 numbers would not be banned.

In 2008, Leicester City NHS Trust looked into their usage of telephone numbers and revealed a complex set of issues to be solved, some of which were fixed later in the year. Enfield Primary Care Trust wrote to all 62 surgeries in the borough warning them that it does not approve of them using premium rate 0844 numbers. It was revealed that Mid-Yorkshire hospital trust had made more than £80,000 from use of a 0844 telephone number in two years.

The Department of Health published a consultation at the end of 2008 calling for views on the usage of 084 numbers in the NHS which received more than 3000 responses. Ofcom recommended the 03 option. In 2009, Heart of Birmingham Primary Care Trust moved 22 GPs to new 0345 numbers.

Although 0870 numbers were banned in 2005, even as late as 2010 there were NHS bodies only now just getting around to complying with that ban.

It had been widely reported in 2009 that 084 numbers were to be banned from the NHS. In December 2009, the Department of Health published directions to NHS bodies concerning the cost of telephone calls made by patients to the NHS: "An NHS body must not enter into, renew or extend a contract or other arrangement for telephone services unless it is satisfied that, having regard to the arrangement as a whole, persons will not pay more to make relevant calls to the NHS body then they would to make equivalent calls to a geographic number." This reiterated the "free at the point of delivery" principle of the NHS and the direction applied to all NHS bodies.

==== GPs banned from using 0844 (and other 084x and 087x) numbers in 2010 ====
In April 2010, the Department of Health introduced new GMS (General Medical Services) contracts so that GPs would now also be covered by the earlier direction. From this point on, the more than 6,500 GP surgeries in England and Wales were banned from using phone numbers that "cost more than calling a geographic number", and given one year to comply. The GMS contract variation was needed as GPs are not NHS bodies, rather independent contractors.

Questions were asked in the Scottish Parliament in June 2010.

A year after the GMS contract variation came into effect, many GPs were continuing to use 0844 numbers in defiance of the ban. In March and May 2011, more than 1,300 GP surgeries were still using the banned 0844 (and 0845/0870) numbers. It was becoming clear that local decision makers (i.e. PCTs and GPs) had failed to understand the 0844 revenue share mechanism as well as the price regulations that apply uniquely to BT and make their call rates atypical when compared to other providers. At least one PCT claimed that they did not know what patients were paying for calls and further claimed that they had no way of finding out, seemingly unaware that every telecoms supplier publishes a detailed price list on their respective websites.

A number of GPs claimed that only calls from landlines should be taken into account, but a statement in Parliament confirmed that "It is absolutely clear that there is no distinction between landlines, mobiles or payphones. The directions are very clear that patients should not expect to be charged any more."

Primary care trusts (PCTs), en masse, had seemingly misunderstood the regulations or had been misled by the incorrect advice spread by NEG and the BMA as by November 2011 more than 1400 GPs were using the "banned" numbers.

Protests against the use of 0844 numbers were growing. There are even cases of GPs changing to 0844 numbers a year after the ban started.

Only a small number of GPs had complied with the ban. Various GPs using 0844 numbers attempted to justify their position based on demonstratably false information. In some areas, patients took it upon themselves to find and publish geographic numbers for GPs continuing to flout the 0844 ban.

In January 2012, a parliamentary debate took place where it was confirmed that users "should not pay more than a geographic rate call" and it was clarified that this applies to "both landlines and mobiles". Additionally, "bundled" or "free minutes" should also count. The reference provides some additional commentary on the major points.

A month later, the Department of Health issued further guidance on the use of 084 numbers in the NHS confirming that GPs should consider "all means of telephoning the practice – including from payphones, mobile phones and landlines" which the BMA disputed. 0844 numbers were mentioned again in a parliamentary debate in March 2012 when the Secretary of State Andrew Lansley confirmed: "We have made it very clear that GPs should not be using 0844 numbers for that purpose and charging patients for them." A small number of surgeries have since complied with the regulation by moving to 01 or 02 numbers but most have not done so.

The Northern Ireland Assembly debated the issue in May 2012 where it was disclosed that 23 of Northern Ireland's 355 GP surgeries use an 0844 number. A briefing note was produced within, and for the usage of, UK government. This covered some of the history relating to the issue. Campaigners had already produced a simplified timeline. In their response to an ongoing Ofcom consultation on simplifying non-geographic numbers, NEG said "Under the proposed new structure, Ofcom expects call cost descriptions to follow the format: 'This call will cost you X pence per minute plus your phone company's access charge.' We do not believe that it is appropriate for a patient to receive the Service Charge information advised by OFCOM when they contact their surgery as this will only seek to alarm them, and perpetuate the myth that all calls (to 084 numbers) are more costly."

In order to comply, GPs should be using numbers that begin 01, 02 or 03 and should not be using numbers that begin 070, 084, 087 or 09. The 034 and 037 ranges are reserved specifically for 084 and 087 migration. GPs using 084 and 087 numbers can migrate to the equivalent 034 or 037 version of their number without ending their phone service contracts. Alternatively they can move to brand new 030 or 033 numbers or to a geographic 01 or 02 number. Only a few GPs and NHS services have chosen 03 numbers even though this should be the most obvious solution since 03 numbers allow the same call queueing and call management facilities as 084 and 087 numbers while costing the same as 01 and 02 numbers for all callers.

In spite of the ban on 0844 numbers in the NHS since April 2010, more GPs continue to sign up to use them however the Phone-paid Services Authority has also taken an interest in extending regulations that already cover 09 and 087 numbers – as used for premium rate chat lines, competitions and phone-in voting systems – to also cover 084 numbers.

Multiple PCTs have failed to enforce the terms of the April 2010 variations to the GMS contract and many GPs continue to use the banned numbers. At least one surgery with an 0844 contract and with considerable time remaining time before it ends has adopted Skype as an alternative method of contacting the surgery. Some surgeries have two telephone numbers: one a premium rate 0844 number with a higher level of service and the other a standard geographic 01 or 02 number with a lower level of service, thereby creating a two-tier system for accessing the NHS services.

Almost three years after the ban, in the South-East of England, usage of 0844 numbers continued unabated. In any case, in 2013 the Consumer Rights Directive will soon make it illegal to use 084 and 087 numbers, indeed any number that "costs more than geographic rate", for customer services and complaints. Where contracts are ending, GPs often choose to return to using 01 and 02 numbers even though 03 numbers cost the same for all callers.

=== Future ===
With widespread abuse of non-geographic numbers continuing unabated, lack of price transparency and low consumer confidence, on 30 April 2010 Ofcom announced a new, wide-ranging review of all non-geographic call services. This is eventually expected to result in 0870 numbers returning to revenue share and their regulation being aligned with that for 0871 and 0872 numbers, 0845 regulation being aligned with that for 0843 and 0844 numbers and all 084 and 087 numbers being covered by a new "unbundled tariffs" scheme.

In June 2014, Article 21 of Directive 2011/83/EU on Consumer Rights came into force. It states

Member States shall ensure that where the trader operates a telephone line for the purpose of contacting him by telephone in relation to the contract concluded, the consumer, when contacting the trader is not bound to pay more than the basic rate.

HM Government enacted Article 19 concerning credit and debit card surcharges much earlier than originally scheduled, and the bulk of the directive in July 2013. However, draft legislation banning 084, 087 and 09 numbers for customer service use wasn't published until August 2013. In the initial draft, various sectors such as finance, passenger transport, roundsmen, gambling and package travel were proposed to be exempt, but the FCA subsequently ruled that the financial sector should be included, and their Call Charges Rule Rule GEN 7.2 came into force on 26 October 2015.

== See also ==
- Telephone numbers in the United Kingdom
- List of dialling codes in the United Kingdom
- PhONEday
- Big Number Change
