= David Edmonds (businessman) =

British businessman (born 1944)

David Albert Edmonds CBE (born 6 March 1944) is a British businessman, former civil servant, and board chair.

The son of Albert and Gladys Edmonds of Kingsley, Cheshire, he was educated at Helsby Grammar School and the University of Keele. He was a civil servant from 1966 to 1974 before becoming a visiting fellow at Johns Hopkins University in the U.S.

Returning to the Civil Service in 1975, from 1979 until 1983 he was Principal Private Secretary to Michael Heseltine, Secretary of State for the Environment. After a year as an under-secretary for Inner City Policy, he became chief executive of the Housing Corporation from 1984 to 1991. He was deputy chairman of the board of the New Statesman and Society from 1988 to 1990. He became a managing director responsible for Group Property and Central Services within NatWest Group (1991–1998). He was Director General of Oftel from 1998 to 2003 where he championed the unbundling of BT's local loop, the reduction of mobile charges and the deregulation of directory enquiries. He then went on to chair NHS Direct from 2004 until 2008. He was appointed as chairman of the Legal Services Board – the over-arching regulator for the legal profession in England and Wales – on 17 May 2008, and reappointed for a second term (2008–2014) He was chair of Wincanton PLC from 2008 until 2011, having joined that board in 2005.

He was a board member of property developer Hammerson plc (2003–2011), a legal services Commissioner (2004–2008), and a founder member of the Ofcom Board (2003–2005). He was a board member of William Hill plc (2005–2014) and of Barchester Health Care (2015-2019).

He was the chair of the charity Crisis (1994–1999), and a member of the Council of Keele University (1996–2004).

He chaired the Governing Board of Kingston University (2012–2020) and was a board member of the Trinity Laban Conservatoire of Music and Dance (2017 to 2019).

He is chair of NHS Shared Business Services, a joint venture between the Department of Health and Social Care and Sopra Steria; of the Phone-paid Services Authority which regulates the provision of services paid for through the phone bill in the UK; of Celescan Ltd, a joint venture between Sopra Steria, the Royal Marsden Hospital and the Institute of Cancer Research; and the Trustee Board of the British Racing Drivers pension trust.

In 2010 he became a board member of the Olympic Park Legacy Company. This was succeeded in 2012 by the London Legacy Development Corporation to hold the responsibility for the operational management of the Queen Elizabeth Olympic Park, with Edmonds continuing to sit on the board. He was chair of the investment committee and was also the first chair of E20 LLP, the joint venture between the London Legacy Development Corporation and the London Borough of Newham. In September 2015 he was appointed chairman of the London Legacy Development Corporation, but resigned on 3 November 2016 after London Mayor Sadiq Khan ordered a detailed investigation into the controversy surrounding the cost of converting the London Stadium for use by West Ham United.

He married Ruth Beech in 1966 and the couple have four children. He is a past president of the Wimbledon Park Golf Club and a member of the Malden Golf Club.

== Honours ==
- CBE (2003);
- University of Keele, honorary Doctor of Letters.

== Bibliography ==
- EDMONDS, David Albert. (2008). In Debrett's People of Today 2008. London: Debrett's Peerage
