= Saynoto0870.com =

saynoto0870.com
- Search page
- Website type: Consumer directory
- Website: www.saynoto0870.com
- Commercial: Yes
- Registration: Not required
- Launched: 1999
- Current status: Online

saynoto0870.com is a UK website with a directory of non-geographic telephone numbers and their geographic alternatives.

The website, which primarily started as a directory of cheaper alternatives to 0870 numbers (hence the name), also lists geographic-rate (01, 02 or 03) or free-to-caller (080) alternatives for 0843, 0844, 0845, 0871, 0872, and 0873 revenue-share numbers.

The vast majority of telephone numbers are submitted by visitors to the website, but the discussion board also offers a place for visitors to request alternative telephone numbers if they are not included in the database. Some companies that advertise a non-geographic number will also offer a number for calling from abroad – usually starting +44 1 or +44 2 – this number can be used within the UK (removing the +44 and replacing it with 0) to avoid the cost of calling non-geographic telephone numbers. Some companies will also offer a geographic alternative if asked.

== Motivations behind the website ==
- Organisations using 084, 087 and 09 non-geographic telephone numbers (except for 0870 numbers from 1 August 2009 to 1 July 2015) automatically impose a Service Charge on all callers. Calls to 01 and 02 geographic numbers, 03 non-geographic numbers, standard 07 mobile numbers and 080 free-to-caller numbers do not attract such an additional charge.
- The revenue derived from the Service Charge is used by the call recipient to cover the call handling and call routing costs incurred at their end of the call. Any excess is paid out under a "revenue share" agreement or may be used as a contribution towards meeting other expenses such as a lease for switchboard equipment.
- Non-geographic telephone numbers beginning 084 and 087 have increasingly been employed for inappropriate uses such as bookings, renewals, refunds, cancellations, customer services and complaints, and for contacting public services including essential health services.
- Most landline providers offer 'inclusive' calls of up to one hour to standard telephone numbers (those beginning with 01, 02 or 03), while calls to 084 and 087 numbers are usually chargeable.
- Mobile telephones on a contract offer hundreds of minutes per month of 'inclusive' calls to standard telephone numbers, while calls to 084 and 087 telephone numbers are always chargeable.
- Calls to most 084 and 087 non-geographic telephone numbers are generally not included in bundled minutes from landlines and even less so from mobile telephones. However, a small number of landline providers do include 0870 and a smaller number include 0845 telephone numbers in some of their call packages.
- Calls to 084 and 087 non-geographic telephone numbers have a much larger Access Charge if called from a mobile telephone, than if called from a landline, making the call price from mobile telephones excessive.
- Before 1 July 2015, calls to 0800 and 0808 numbers were chargeable when called from most contract and pay-as-you-go mobile telephones. Calls to 0500 numbers remained chargeable from mobile telephones until closure of this range on 3 June 2017.

== Publicity ==
The site has gained popularity by being awarded Website of the Day by BBC Radio 2. It has also been featured on the BBC Radio 2's Jeremy Vine show and been awarded BBC Radio Gloucestershire's Website of the Week. Newspaper coverage includes The Guardian, London Evening Standard, The Daily Telegraph, and The Independent. Online coverage includes BBC News. It is also mentioned by 'Which?'.
