= Personal numbering =

Virtual telephone number service in the UK

Personal numbering is the name for the virtual telephone number service in the UK. Typically the national destination code used for this service is 70, dialled as 070 from within the UK and +44 70 from outside. The service provides a flexible virtual telephone number able to be routed to any other number, including international mobiles. For example, the UK number +44 70 0585 0070 might route to an Inmarsat satellite phone number, allowing the user to have a UK number while roaming globally.

== History ==
In the United States, AT&T ran a trial in 1991 which led, in 1992, to the AT&T EasyReach 700 service of follow me numbers, on area code 700.

=== Early days ===
After protracted lobbying of Oftel throughout 1992, FleXtel launched the UK's first Personal Telephone Number Service, using the 0956 7xxxxx number range in December 1993, within the old One2One 0956 xxxxxx mobile number range.

=== 070 introduction ===
In 1995 the UK telecoms regulator, Oftel (now Ofcom), moved geographic area codes starting 0x1 to new 01x1, and starting 02xx to 09xx to new 012xx to 019xx, thus freeing many of the former 02xx to 09xx codes for new uses. Oftel reserved the whole of the 070 xxxx xxxx range exclusively for personal numbering, imitating the USA area code 700. FleXtel migrated its existing customers from the old 0956 7xxxxx numbers to new 070 107x xxxx numbers during a two-year transition phase, ending 28 April 2001.

== Fraudulent use ==
For two decades this service was plagued with "significant scamming activity" of various sorts as users can mistakenly assume they are calling a UK mobile telephone number that generally costs far less.

(For the telephone numbering plan context of 070 numbers see Telephone numbers in the United Kingdom).

=== Call cost scams ===
A range of scams revolve around UK residents being tricked into making calls to 070 numbers that attract much larger than normal call costs.

=== False UK number scams ===
In its full format (e.g. +44 70 0585 0070) an 070 number will be internationally recognisable as a UK number - even though it might in fact terminate to a mobile number anywhere - this feature is used in a variety of scams.

== Ofcom reforms ==
Concerned at the number of scams, Ofcom consulted on removing revenue share from the 070 range and this took effect in 2009. They had previously considered other options such as moving this service to the unused 06 number range or enforcing a pre-call announcement of the call charges. Although consulted on, those other remedies were never put into effect.

Concerned at the lack of transparency and the high retail charges for calls to 070 numbers, Ofcom launched a call cost review in 2017. This led to a consultation in 2018 which recommended capping the termination rate or wholesale rate at no more than the rate for calling a mobile number. Those changes took effect on 1 October 2019 and several phone providers have already passed the saving on by now including calls to 070 numbers within inclusive allowances.

It is reported that scams on this number range fell by 75% in the year following this change.

== See also ==
- Personal Numbers, similar service in Spain
- Area code 700, similar US service
- Follow-me, similar concept for PBXs
- Virtual number
- Universal Personal Telecommunications
