= Helsby High School =

Location
- Chester Road; Helsby, Cheshire, WA6 0HY; England

Information
- Type: Community school
- Motto: Latin: Ut tibi sic aliis (Unto thyself so unto others)
- Established: 1897
- Founder: Sir John Brunner, 1st Baronet
- Local authority: Cheshire West and Chester
- Department for Education URN: 111440 Tables
- Ofsted: Reports
- Headmaster: Martin Hill
- Staff: 100
- Gender: Co-Educational
- Age: 11 to 18
- Enrolment: 1,376 as of September 2020
- Capacity: 1,406
- Colours: Bottle Green; Black
- Telephone: 01928 723551
- Website: www.helsbyhigh.org.uk

Helsby High School is a community secondary school and sixth form in Helsby, Cheshire.

Its A-level results are in the top ten per cent of comprehensives in the UK, and eighth in Cheshire for the 2018/2019 academic year.

== History ==
=== Runcorn School ===
On 14 April 1894 John Brunner MP, a partner in Brunner Mond, one of the forerunners of ICI, laid the foundations of the old school buildings on Waterloo Street in Runcorn.

In 1897 the school opened as Runcorn Institute School, being renamed in 1907 the Runcorn Institute County Secondary School.

The 1908 Inspector's Report shows a school with 133 pupils, drawn mainly from the Runcorn area, but with several others coming in from Frodsham, Helsby and Ellesmere Port. The inspection team drew attention to the inconvenience of using a technical institute as an academic institute.

They criticised the "foul gases that pass into the woodwork room" when a gas engine was running.

The inspectors were hopeful that when the Runcorn-Widnes Bridge was completed in 1905, the site might increase in value for office purposes, and a more suitable site could then be found. In 1914 a further inspection declared the building unsuitable as a secondary school.

=== War years ===
By the 1930s it was clear that the school could not continue on its existing site. Helsby was proposed as the new site for the local grammar schools. Building work started in 1938, but was interrupted by the outbreak of war. By 1939 only the walls of the school had been completed.

In light of the shortage of building materials the education committee were forced to seal off the girls' school.

The boys' school was completed however in 1940. In 1941 the buildings were requisitioned by the Ministry of Supply, and became a hostel for munitions workers in Chester.

There are no current records of any further uses during the war. In 1947 the buildings were de-requisitioned, and in 1948 the Ministry of Education approved the reinstatement and completion of all the buildings.

In 1949 the boys' and girls' schools were completed and re-opened. The schools were then occupied by 350 boys and girls from the Runcorn County Grammar School, and, in accordance with the Education Act 1944 became the County Grammar School for Boys, Helsby and the County Grammar School for Girls, Helsby.

=== Post-war period ===
Through the 1950s and 1960s the grammar schools at Helsby were the main grammar schools in the Runcorn area, and the period was generally one of stability. Recorded highlights indicate something of the humdrum and conservative feel of the period: in 1951 the Conservatives' victory in Helsby's mock election reflected the national result, as Winston Churchill was returned as Prime Minister.

In 1953, the Coronation year, the school took part in the Coronation Survey of Education in the Empire, which aimed to show that "although methods of education and ways of life differ, we are united under our Queen in the British Empire and Commonwealth".

In the harsh winter gales of 1966 the girls were sent home from school when strong gusts broke glass panels, rendering the building unsafe.

=== Comprehensive ===
In the predominantly Labour-led governments of the 1960s and 1970s, educational trends tended toward comprehensive schooling for all. This was to lead eventually to the merger of the two schools, and the end of the merged school's existence as a grammar school.

In 1977 the last 11+ cohort was admitted but they were only to have one year in the grammar school, as in 1978 the two grammar schools were merged by the LEA, with support from the Governing Body (please see minutes of the Governing Body from the 1970s), into a single comprehensive school, to serve a similar area as the grammar schools, although this cohort continued to receive single-sex education (as did the earlier cohorts moving through the school) until the end of their GCE examinations at the age of 16.

By 1997, Helsby High School had emerged as one of the most successful schools in the county, based on both academic and non-academic activities. In 2003 the school was awarded Specialist Science College status.

== Subjects ==
At present, the school curriculum employs many different subjects. In the fourth form, the three Sciences - Chemistry, Biology and Physics - are separated out (having been taught as a combined science course in KS3) to allow specialist teachers to teach their subject with optimum success. Other subjects include History, Geography, Business Studies, Systems and Control, Art, Music, Drama, Information and Health and Social Care, Food Technology, Media Studies and Physical Education.

Throughout the school, pupils are set into eight or ten sets - four or five in each half of the year group. In the third form, class sizes are made smaller for the Sciences as three separate science courses are offered.

The school offers both French and German. The latter subject is taught from the second form onwards. Latin was offered as a subject until 1999 when lack of uptake led to its removal from the GCSE option list. The subjects available for GCSE and/or A-Level, surplus to subjects taught in lower school include Business Studies, Economics, Electronics, Media Studies, Drama & Theatre Studies, Government & Politics, Sociology and Psychology.

=== Music, drama and sport ===
The school has Junior and Senior Bands, a jazz band, a range of instrument specific ensembles, a folk group and choirs.

The school puts on plays and musicals.

The school's basketball team represented Great Britain at the schools' World Championships held in Pau, France.

== Notable former pupils ==
- George Gilbody, lightweight boxer, competitor at the 1980 Summer Olympics in Moscow
- Raymond Gilbody, bantamweight boxer, competitor at the 1980 Summer Olympics in Moscow, British bantamweight boxing champion (1985-1987)
- Paul Marsden, MP for Shrewsbury and Atcham (1997-2005), and now chief executive since 2008 of the Painting and Decorating Association
- Louise Woodward, convicted of the involuntary manslaughter of a child in her care in Massachusetts in 1997
- Alice Coote, mezzo-soprano
- Sophie Ecclestone, cricketer

=== Helsby County Grammar School ===
- David Edmonds CBE, businessperson, civil servant and board chair
- Peter Ford, Ambassador to Syria from 2003 to 2006, and to Bahrain from 1999-2003
- Brian MacArthur, newspaper editor, notably of Today from 1986 to 1987
- Tony Ross, illustrator
- Paul Sherwen, professional cyclist and broadcaster from 1970 to 1974
- Gary Parsonage, 1996 Atlanta Olympics, member of Team Great Britain, riding Magic Rouge in Equestrianism Three-Day Event
- Chris French, Psychologist
