= Bill shock =

Reaction to an excessive cellphone bill

In telecommunications, bill shock is the negative reaction a subscriber can experience if their phone bill has unexpected charges. Bill shock can happen when, for example, a user grossly overuses data applications without an appropriate data plan, or uses a mobile device while roaming (whether domestically or internationally) without understanding the voice or data roaming charges involved.

The use of non-geographic telephone numbers in the United Kingdom has also been a major cause of bill shock. Pollster YouGov found that 49% of mobile users have been surprised to see how much they have been charged for calling non-geographic numbers and 90% believe organisations should make the cost of these calls clearer. According to Ofcom, UK consumers paid around £1.9 billion for calls to non-geographic numbers in 2009.

== Impact ==
In some cases bill shock can be extreme, usually a result of a mobile bill priced into the tens of thousands of dollars. These cases often make news both locally and nationally due to the sense of compassion the experience provokes, and the suitability the story has for mainstream media. This can result from another company - not the customer's provider - refusing to waive roaming charges. In Europe and the United States, governments are becoming more involved with monitoring issues around bill shock and implementing proper regulations around smart devices that protect consumers. Notably, the U.S. Federal Communications Commission in the United States handles nearly all FCC domestic wireless telecommunications programs, policies, and outreach initiatives. A survey in 2010 revealed that over 30 million Americans are impacted by bill shock each year.

It can be difficult to prevent bill shock while using a mobile device because monitoring the data, voice and SMS and roaming consumption on a mobile device is difficult. It can also be difficult for phone companies to alert their customers to potential impending bill shock, because various third-party companies impose various roaming charges (a mobile phone company pays other companies for its customer's usage of their networks), so the customer's usage of networks in different areas of the country or the world will result in different charges. Migratory birds can be particularly prone to bill shock; in 2019 a single Russian eagle used up the entire telecoms budget of a research project, when it unexpectedly flew to Iran where it was charged over three times more for each SMS message it sent.

Mobility is an important trend in the marketplace as consumers and businesses continue to embrace smart devices. The following mobility trends are noteworthy as they demonstrate the continued dependence on smart devices, and all of these can have billing effects. If consumers use products or services without checking pricing, they may experience bill shock.

1. Consumerization of IT: Employee-owned devices on the corporate network. Consumerization is driving the adoption of mobility in the workplace. Businesses see mobility as an opportunity to offer employees flexibility. Companies enhance their revenue by using devices that increase productivity.
2. Device diversity: iOS, Android, Windows, etc.
3. App explosion: People are communicating beyond email and web. Many apps are getting integrated into workplace operations.
4. Mobile threat emergence: Android an early favorite
5. Changes in Wireless Speed: 4G speeds have revolutionized wireless accessibility. Individuals are more inclined to stay connected when the networks are fast and efficient.
6. Carrier plans are also becoming more customizable and complex, except with certain stable calling plans, such as those often offered by small and regional carriers, and this makes it hard for individuals to completely control their usage and costs.

== Legal action ==
Since 1 July 2010 bill shock is mitigated in the EU. Eurotariff protected consumers by introducing a cut-off mechanism once the bill reaches €50 per month, unless they choose another cut-off limit.

== See also ==
- Oligopoly
- User-in-the-loop: Transparent dynamic prices all provided before usage
