= Oftel =

Former British regulatory body

The Office of Telecommunications (Oftel) (the telecommunications regulator) was a department in the United Kingdom government, under civil service control, charged with promoting competition and maintaining the interests of consumers in the UK telecommunications market. It was set up under the Telecommunications Act 1984 after privatisation of the nationalised operator BT.

Oftel was accused by critics such as Freeserve of having been "captured" by BT, and of giving the dominant operator too much freedom to leverage its monopoly status in fixed line telephony into other markets such as ADSL.

On 29 December 2003, the duties of Oftel were inherited by Ofcom, which was the result of the consolidation of five separate British telecommunications, radio spectrum and broadcasting regulators.

== Director-General of Oftel ==
- Bryan Carsberg 1 August 1984 – 12 June 1992
- Bill Wigglesworth (acting) 13 June 1992 – 31 March 1998
- Donald Cruickshank 1 April 1993 – 31 March 1998
- David Edmonds 1 April 1998 – 29 December 2003

== See also ==
- UK Telephone area (STD) codes
- UK topics
