= Virtual number =

Telephone number without a physical line

A virtual number, also known as direct inward dialing (DID) or access numbers, is a telephone number without a directly associated telephone line. Usually, these numbers are programmed to forward incoming calls to one of the pre-set telephone numbers, chosen by the client: fixed, mobile or VoIP. A virtual number can work like a gateway between traditional calls (PSTN) and VoIP.

Subscribers to virtual numbers may use their existing phones, without the need to purchase additional hardware, i.e. use the numerous available software.

A virtual private number is a telephone number that forwards incoming calls to any of a number of pre-set telephone numbers. These are also called a follow-me number, a virtual telephone number or (in the UK) Personal Number.

Usually, a virtual telephone number can be set to forward calls to different telephone numbers depending on the time of day and the day of the week using time of day routing; for example, between 9 and 5 on working days incoming calls will be forwarded to one's workplace, but in the weekends to one's cellphone.

The availability (and acceptable use) of virtual phone numbers are subject to the regulatory situation in the issuing country.

Recently, a new category of service has emerged: virtual mobile phone number. A virtual mobile phone number is a telephone number that is not permanently associated with a physical SIM card or specific mobile device but can be used through a smartphone application. These services allow users to make and receive calls and text messages. In fact, virtual mobile numbers are similar to traditional mobile numbers when it comes to the service that can accessed using them.

Some providers offer real mobile numbers issued through mobile network operators, rather than Voice over Internet Protocol (VoIP) numbers. Real mobile numbers can often be used with services that require SMS verification, such as banking platforms, social media services, and two-factor authentication systems.

Virtual mobile number services are typically accessed through mobile applications that provide calling, messaging, voicemail, and account management features. Many platforms also integrate additional technologies such as embedded SIM (eSIM) support, enabling users to access mobile data networks in multiple countries without requiring a physical SIM card.

Virtual mobile number services are used by international travelers, remote workers, businesses operating across borders, and individuals who wish to maintain multiple phone numbers for privacy or organizational purposes.

== Applications and example of use ==
- Businesses – a company located in China can have a phone number in Los Angeles or London without paying for a fixed foreign exchange line. Virtual numbers are very popular among call centers which appear to be located in one country, when they are in one or more countries in different time zone, delivering efficient 24/7 cover.

Virtual numbers faced popularity due to the growing trend of remote working, as it allows for employees to make and receive calls as their businesses' phone number remotely. It is especially popular in small businesses, startups or businesses with remote workers using virtual numbers to manage their inbound and outbound calling.

- Individuals – Individual usage of virtual numbers can vary, with many using the service to have 2 separate numbers, one for business and the other for personal usage. Services like Google Voice offer virtual numbers to individuals. One popular use case of virtual numbers are travelers, migrants, and immigrants, who can enjoy often cheaper calling rates rather than making an international call via their carrier. They may also be used to protect a user's privacy by hiding their real number to callers.
- Specific businesses – calling cards or callback. Virtual numbers work like access numbers, e.g., the phone number that (calling cards) or callback's user has to dial to make the call/(use callback).
- Marketing – some companies use virtual numbers for various marketing campaigns, or different media channels; this allows them to track which campaign or medium brings what kind of traffic, as well as send different marketing materials to different audiences.
- Virtual services – various providers of virtual business services (virtual address, virtual receptionist, virtual office) will use a virtual number to tie in their other virtual services together. This allows their customers to have a phone, address and voice presence almost anywhere in the world.
- Disposable numbers are phone numbers that are used for a limited time. They are frequently utilized by users to protect their primary personal numbers and maintain privacy during SMS verification processes on various online platforms. In San Antonio fake businesses used disposable numbers printed on pizza fliers to deliver inferior quality pizzas.

Most voice over IP providers offer virtual numbers; unbundled providers label these as "DIDs" (direct inward dial). These are typically offered as local geographic numbers in various selected cities or as toll-free numbers, with the non-geographic number carrying higher per-minute cost to receive calls.

In the North American Numbering Plan, Area code 500 and Area code 533 are follow-me numbers, and referred to as Personal Communications Service (NANP).

In the United Kingdom, there are over 600 geographic area codes using 01 and 02 numbers which can also be set up as virtual numbers. Non-geographic numbers such as those starting 03, 08 or 09 can also be used in this way.

== See also ==
- Follow-me, the same concept for PBXs
- Unified Messaging
- Universal Personal Telecommunications
