= History of the National Health Service =

The name National Health Service (NHS) is used to refer to the publicly funded health care services of England, Scotland and Wales, individually or collectively. Northern Ireland's services are known as 'Health and Social Care' to promote its dual integration of health and social services.

For details of the history of each National Health Service, particularly since 1999, see:

- History of the National Health Service (England)
- History of NHS Scotland
- History of NHS Wales
- History of Health and Social Care in Northern Ireland

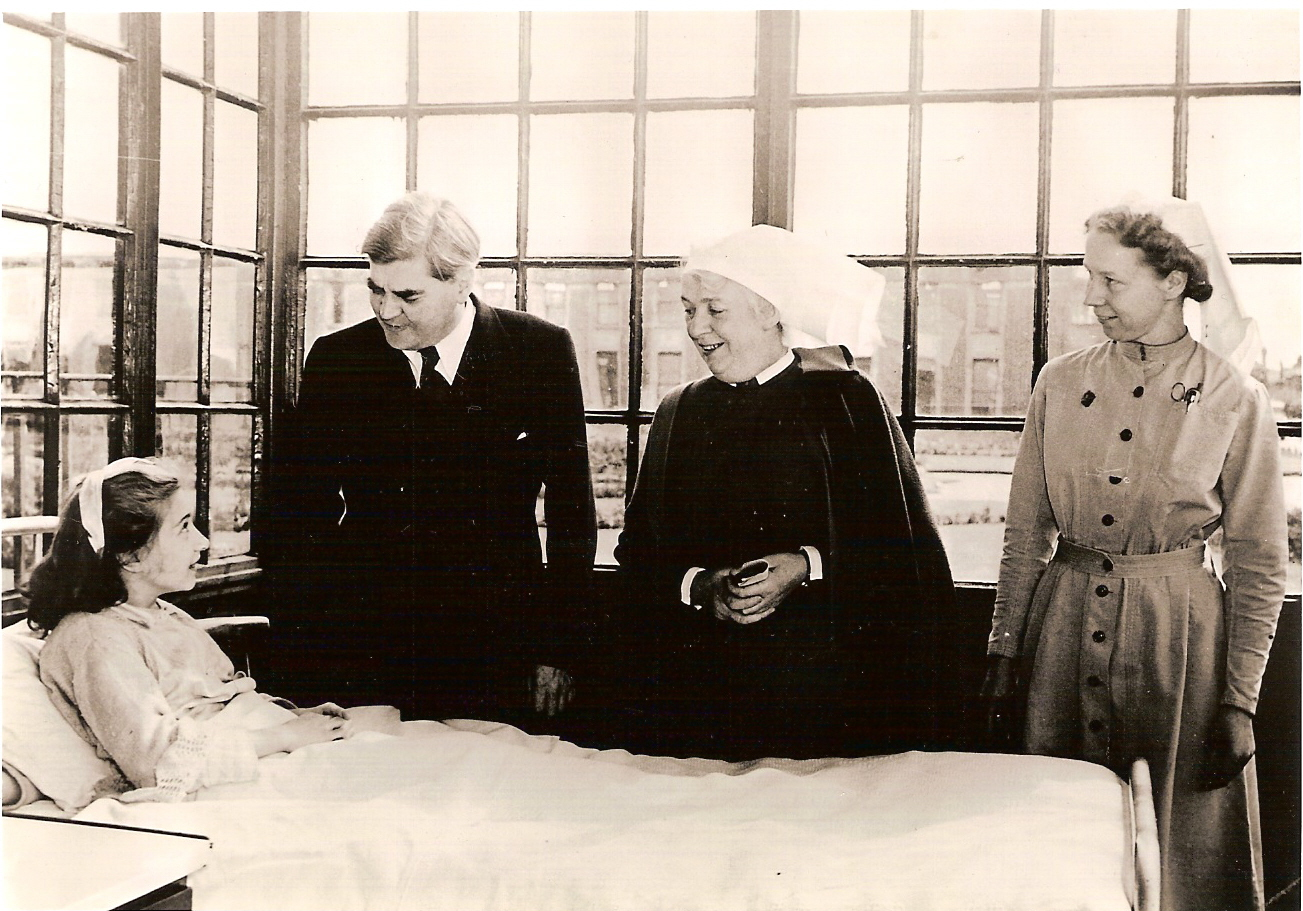
Aneurin Bevan, Minister of Health, on the first day of the National Health Service, 5 July 1948 at Trafford General Hospital then known as Park Hospital, Davyhulme, near Manchester

The NHS was one of the first universal health care systems established anywhere in the world. A leaflet was sent to every household in June 1948 which explained that

It will provide you with all medical, dental and nursing care. Everyone — rich or poor, man, woman or child — can use it or any part of it. There are no charges, except for a few special items. There are no insurance qualifications. But it is not a “charity”. You are all paying for it, mainly as tax payers, and it will relieve your money worries in time of illness.

— Central Office of Information, for the Ministry of Health

The NHS in Scotland was established as a separate entity with its own legislation, the National Health Service (Scotland) Act 1947, from the foundation of the NHS in 1948. Northern Ireland likewise had its own legislation in 1948. Wales was part of a single system with England for the first 20 years of the NHS. In 1969, responsibility for the NHS in Wales was passed to the Secretary of State for Wales from the Secretary of State for Health, who was thereafter just responsible for the NHS in England.

== Background ==
Dr Benjamin Moore, a Liverpool physician, in 1910 in The Dawn of the Health Age was probably the first to use the words 'National Health Service'. He established the State Medical Service Association which held its first meeting in 1912 and continued to exist until it was replaced by the Socialist Medical Association in 1930.

Before the National Health Service was created in 1948, patients were generally required to pay for their health care. Free treatment was sometimes available from charitable voluntary hospitals. Some local authorities operated hospitals for local ratepayers (under a system originating with the Poor Laws). The London County Council (LCC) on 1 April 1930 took over from the abolished Metropolitan Asylums Board responsibility for 140 hospitals, medical schools and other medical institutions. The Local Government Act 1929 allowed local authorities to run services over and above those authorised by the Poor Laws and in effect to provide medical treatment for everyone. By the outbreak of the Second World War, the LCC was running the largest public health service in Britain.

Dr A. J. Cronin's controversial novel The Citadel, published in 1937, had fomented extensive criticism about the severe inadequacies of health care. The author's innovative ideas were not only essential to the conception of the NHS, but his best-selling novels are also said to have greatly contributed to the Labour Party's victory in 1945.

Systems of health insurance usually consisted of private schemes such as friendly societies or welfare societies. Under the National Insurance Act 1911, introduced by David Lloyd George, a small amount was deducted from weekly wages, to which were added contributions from the employer and the government. In return for the record of contributions, the workman was entitled to medical care (as well as retirement and unemployment benefits) though not necessarily to the drugs prescribed. To obtain medical care, he registered with a doctor. Each doctor in General Practice who participated in the scheme thus had a 'panel' of those who have made an insurance under the system, and was paid a capitation grant out of the fund calculated upon the number. Lloyd George's name survives in the Lloyd George envelope in which most primary care records in England are stored, although today most working records in primary care are at least partially computerised. This imperfect scheme only covered workers who paid their National Insurance Contributions and was known as 'Lloyd George's Ambulance Wagon'. Most women and children were not covered.

== Foundation ==
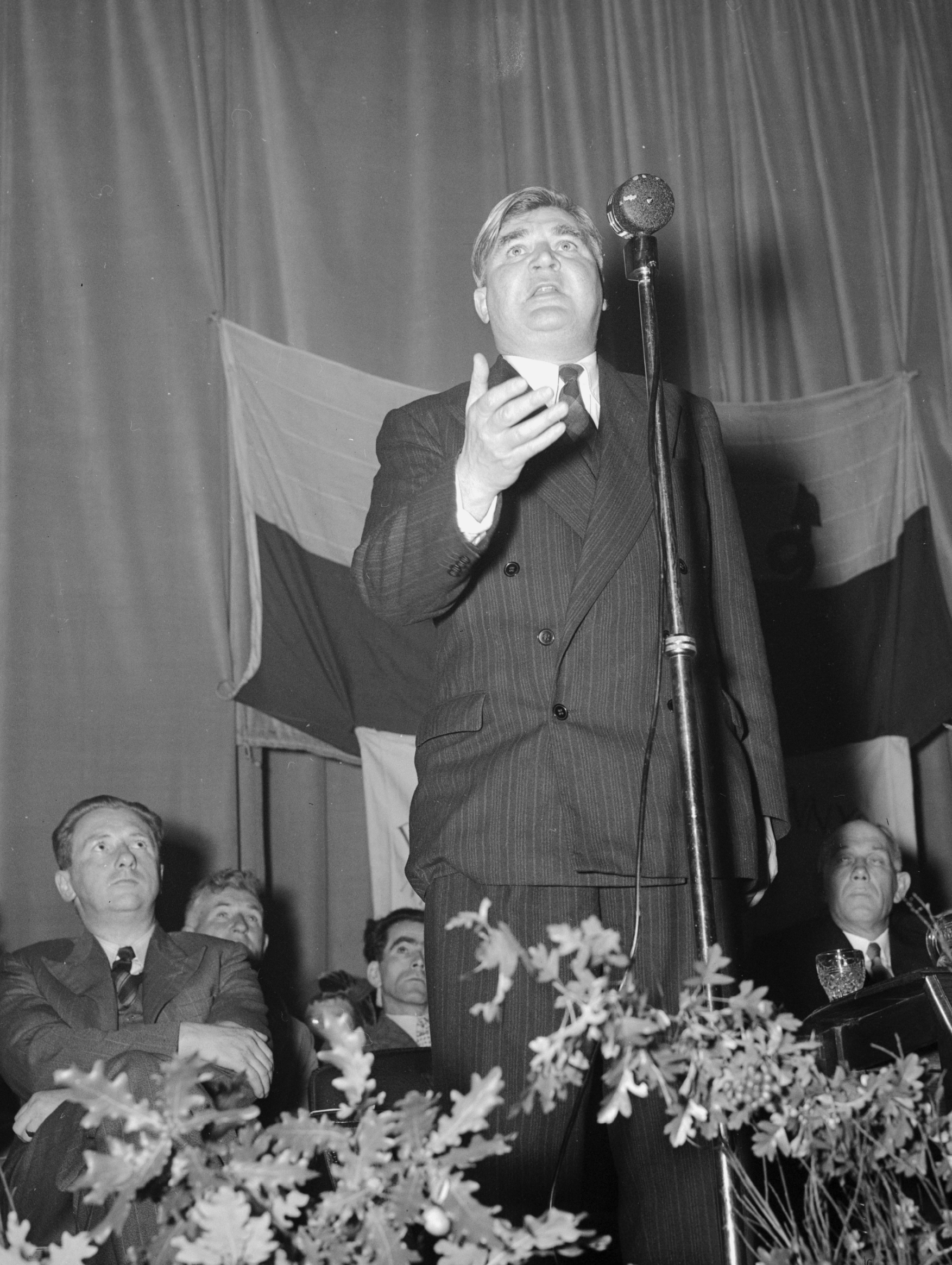
Aneurin Bevan, who built on Sir Henry Willink's vision of a National Health Service with the establishment of the NHS

Bertrand Dawson was commissioned in 1919 by Christopher Addison, the first British Minister of Health to produce a report on "schemes requisite for the systematised provision of such forms of medical and allied services as should, in the opinion of the Council, be available for the inhabitants of a given area". An Interim Report on the Future Provision of Medical and Allied Services was produced in 1920, though no further report ever appeared. The report laid down plans for a network of primary and secondary health centres, and was very influential in subsequent debates about the National Health Service. However, the fall of the Lloyd George government prevented any implementation of those ideas at that time.

The Labour Party in 1932 accepted a resolution moved by Somerville Hastings calling for the establishment of a State Medical Service and in 1934 the Labour Party Conference at Southport unanimously accepted an official document on a National Health Service.

Prior to the Second World War there was already consensus that health insurance should be extended to the dependants of the wage-earner, and that the voluntary and local authority hospitals should be integrated. A British Medical Association (BMA) pamphlet, "A General Medical Service for the Nation" was issued along these lines in 1938. However, no action was taken due to the international crisis. During the war, a new centralised state-run Emergency Hospital Service employed doctors and nurses to care for those injured by enemy action and arrange for their treatment in whichever hospital was available. The existence of the service made voluntary hospitals dependent on the Government and there was a recognition that many would be in financial trouble once peace arrived. The need to do something to guarantee the voluntary hospitals meant that hospital care drove the impetus for reform.

In February 1941 the Deputy Permanent Secretary at the Ministry of Health recorded privately areas of agreement on post-war health policy which included "a complete health service to be available to every member of the community" and on 9 October 1941, the Minister of Health Ernest Brown announced that the government proposed to ensure that there was a comprehensive hospital service available to everyone in need of it and that local authorities would be responsible for providing it. The Medical Planning Commission set up by the professional bodies went one stage further in May 1942 recommending (in an interim report) a National Health Service with general practitioners working through health centres and hospitals run by regional administrations. When in 1942 Arthur Greenwood, the Labour Party Deputy Leader and cabinet minister with responsibility for post-war reconstruction, successfully pressed the cabinet to commission a report into social insurance from economist and social reformer William Beveridge, Beveridge attached an assumption to the Beveridge Report that this same idea would be implemented; his report stressed the importance of it.

Developing the idea into firm policy proved difficult. Although the BMA had been part of the Medical Planning Commission, at their conference in September 1943 the association changed policy to oppose local authority control of hospitals and to favour extension of health insurance instead of GPs working for state health centres. When Conservative MP and Health Minister Henry Willink prepared a white paper endorsing a National Health Service, it was attacked by Brendan Bracken and Lord Beaverbrook and resignations were threatened on both sides. However, the Cabinet endorsed the White Paper which was published in 1944. This White Paper includes the founding principles of the NHS: it was to be funded out of general taxation and not through national insurance, and services would be provided by the same doctors and the same hospitals, but:

- Services were provided free at the point of use;
- Services were financed from central taxation;
- Everyone was eligible for care (even people temporarily resident or visiting the country).

Willink then set about trying to assuage the doctors, a job taken over by Aneurin Bevan in Clement Attlee's Labour Party government after the war ended. Bevan decided that the 1944 white paper's proposal for local authority control of voluntary hospitals was not workable, as he felt that local authorities were too small to manage hospitals. He decided that "the only thing to do was to create an entirely new hospital service, to take over the voluntary hospitals, and to take over the local government hospitals and to organise them as a single hospital service". He did so working with the civil servant John Hawton.

This structure of the NHS in England and Wales was established by the National Health Service Act 1946 which received royal assent on 6 November 1946. The Act implemented a system where each person resident would be signed up to a specific general practitioner (GP) as the point of entry into the system, building on the foundations laid in 1912 by the introduction of National Insurance and the list system for general practice. Patients would have access to all medical, dental and nursing care they needed without having to pay for it at the time.

Many doctors were initially opposed to Bevan's plan, primarily on the grounds that it reduced their level of independence. The British Medical Association voted in May 1948 not to join the new service, but Bevan worked hard to bring them on board by the time the new arrangements launched on 5 July 1948 knowing that without doctors, there would be no health service. Being a shrewd political operator, Bevan managed to push through the radical health care reform measure by dividing and cajoling the opposition, as well as by offering lucrative payment structures for consultants. At a dinner in late 1955 or early 1956 to celebrate the publication of the Guillebaud Report into NHS costs Bevan remarked to Julian Tudor Hart "ultimately I had to stuff their mouths with gold" about his handling of the consultants. This is often quoted as "I stuffed their mouths with gold".

== Establishment ==
In 1979 across the whole UK there were about 2,750 NHS hospitals with about 480,000 beds, accounting for about 70% of total NHS expenditure. About one-third of beds in England were then provided in new or converted accommodation built since 1948 with a higher proportion in Northern Ireland, but lower in Scotland and Wales. Beds for mental illness, geriatric patients and mental handicap were much more likely to be in older buildings than acute or maternity services.

== Access ==
Aneurin Bevan, in considering the provision of NHS services to overseas visitors wrote, in 1952, that it would be "unwise as well as mean to withhold the free service from the visitor to Britain. How do we distinguish a visitor from anybody else? Are British citizens to carry means of identification everywhere to prove that they are not visitors? For if the sheep are to be separated from the goats both must be classified. What began as an attempt to keep the Health Service for ourselves would end by being a nuisance to everybody."

The provision of free treatment to non-UK-residents was increasingly restricted, with overseas visitor hospital charging regulations introduced in 2015.

== Funding ==
=== Early years ===
When the NHS was launched in 1948 it had a budget of £437 million (equivalent to £13.74 billion in 2025).

In 1955/56 health spending was 11.2% of the public services budget.

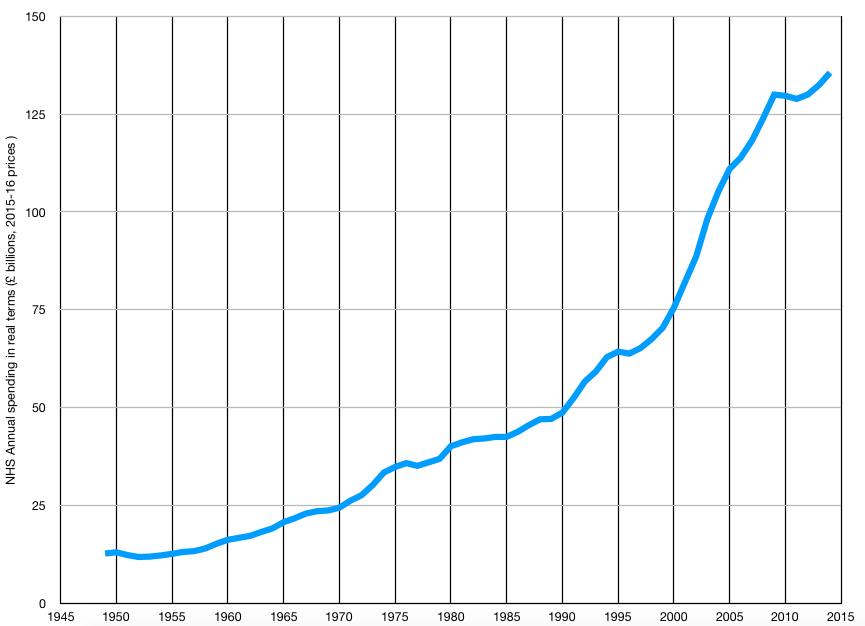
NHS Spending [1948/49–2014/15]

At its inception, the NHS experienced many of the cost control problems that had been encountered under the earlier National Insurance Act 1911, but to a greater degree because the entire population (not just insured workers) was now provided with Healthcare in England free at the point of delivery.

As with general practice as a whole, the arrangements for prescribing and dispensing drugs in the early NHS were based on those operated by the Local insurance committee. Most drugs were prescribed by general practitioners, the majority of products were supplied by pharmacists, and rural practices could apply to self-dispense medicines for patients living more than one mile from a pharmacy. Pharmacists received a fee for each item dispensed and were reimbursed at nationally agreed rates. Dispensing doctors could choose either to be remunerated on the same basis as pharmacists or to receive a capitation fee intended to cover the majority of product costs.

The new body responsible for pricing prescriptions and reimbursing pharmacists, the Joint Pricing Committee, initially struggled to cope with demand. A backlog of some 60 million prescriptions from the Second World War and a doubling of prescription volumes after the introduction of the NHS created delays in reimbursement. Although effective in ensuring patients received medicines, the system incorporated few mechanisms to automatically control public expenditure on drugs. For example, there were no direct limits on the volume of medicines prescribed by GPs, and pharmacists had little incentive to advise doctors on cost-effective prescribing.

=== Controlling prescribing costs ===
Since its foundation in 1948, the NHS has faced rising pharmaceutical expenditure linked to increased prescribing volumes, the introduction of new branded medicines, and variations in prescribing practice. A range of mechanisms have been introduced over time to contain costs, including the distribution of the British National Formulary, monitoring of high-cost prescribers, and the development of pricing and reimbursement systems.

==== Regional variations ====
Significant regional variations in brand prescribing were observed. A survey of 17,301 prescriptions dispensed in September 1949 found differences between areas classified as "residential", "industrial" and "suburban".

Regional variations in branded prescribing, September 1949
Area	Branded prescriptions	% of total
Residential	1,455	27%
Industrial	1,323	21%
Suburban	790	14%

The authors of the survey concluded that the observed differences were probably "due more to the prescribing habits of the doctors concerned than to the social groups catered for".

In consequence, additional measures were introduced to manage rising prescribing costs. The British National Formulary (BNF) was distributed free to all GPs, high-cost prescribers were visited by regional medical officers, and a system for investigating and penalising excessive prescribing was established. However, memories of the unpopular "Floating Sixpence" scheme under the NIS meant that budgets or incentive systems were not initially introduced.

==== Brand prescribing ====
The NHS began during a period of rapid pharmaceutical innovation in which many new proprietary medicines became available. From July 1948 onwards, family doctors were able to prescribe a wider range of (often more expensive) branded products than under the NIS. This led to a rapid increase in branded prescribing rates and costs that administrators found difficult to control. A post-war survey showed the rapid growth of branded prescribing under the National Insurance Scheme and early NHS years.

Proportion of branded drugs prescribed, 1947–57
Year	Proportion of all items supplied (%)	Proportion of overall spend (%)
1947	7.0	24.0
1950	18.0	44.0
1956	40.5	66.0
1957	48.0	70.0

==== Joint Committee on Prescribing ====
In response to the growth in branded prescribing by general practitioners, the Central and Scottish Health Services Councils established the Joint Committee on Prescribing in 1949. Chaired by Sir Henry Cohen, the committee issued a circular letter to all GPs suggesting that significant savings could be achieved if proprietary brands were prescribed as their standard (generic) alternatives.

In its interim report of June 1950, the committee concluded that absolute restrictions on NHS prescribing were impracticable and that GPs should retain freedom to prescribe any drugs considered necessary for their patients. However, the committee’s final report in 1954 recommended a framework for evaluating the appropriateness of particular classes of drugs. Within this framework, pharmaceutical products were grouped into six categories:

1. New drugs of proved therapeutic value but not yet standard.
2. Proprietary brands of standard drugs.
3. Standard preparations in elegant forms or vehicles.
4. Modifications not therapeutically superior to existing preparations.
5. Preparations of unproven therapeutic value.
6. Preparations combining elements of categories 4 and 5.

The report recommended that drugs in category 1 should be freely prescribable, categories 2–4 should only be available subject to satisfactory price arrangements with manufacturers, and categories 5–6 should not be prescribed.

==== The approved list ====
Following the Joint Committee’s recommendations, the Chief Medical Officer produced an "approved list" of approximately 5,000 products recommended for NHS prescription. Distributed to all GPs with an accompanying letter, the list suggested that excluded preparations should only be prescribed once the practitioner had "ascertained the cost and compared it with that of identical or similar standard preparations."

Compliance with the approved list was voluntary. The British Medical Journal observed that "for the already paper-bound general practitioner one wonders if the irritation of more printed reference matter will defeat its purpose."

Despite these efforts, governments found it difficult to influence prescribing behaviour directly. Reliance on voluntary cooperation from the medical profession, the pharmaceutical industry, and patients often limited the effectiveness of cost-control measures. Doctors resisted restrictions that might compromise clinical freedom, the pharmaceutical industry was reluctant to adopt policies that reduced profits, and patient expectations for medicines remained largely unchanged.

==== The Hinchcliffe Committee ====
Following the limited success of revised prescription charges, the Ministry of Health turned to representatives of the medical profession and the pharmaceutical industry for further measures to contain costs. After discussions with the British Medical Association (BMA), the Hinchcliffe Committee was appointed in June 1957 to investigate the factors contributing to the rise in NHS prescribing costs and to make policy recommendations.

The committee took almost two years to publish its final report, during which time major new pharmaceutical policy initiatives were suspended. Its inquiry considered a wide range of influences, including the training of medical students, the provision of information on new drugs, the impact of consultants and patients on GP prescribing, drug advertising, the right of doctors to prescribe, and the role of retail pharmacists. It also examined issues such as prescription charges, restrictions on quantities supplied, and the need for a permanent advisory body on prescribing and costs.

The committee reviewed whether prescribing behaviour could be improved. It concluded that while there was "no evidence of widespread and irresponsible extravagance" in general practice, there was scope for economy. It recommended against automatic substitution of generic drugs for proprietary brands at the point of dispensing, as this might discourage doctors from learning generic names. Instead, the committee advocated systematic postgraduate training in pharmacology and therapeutics for GPs, better access to information on drug prices, and encouragement to select the least expensive appropriate drugs.

The report reflected a belief that most GPs were rational prescribers, but that their decisions were limited by the information and training available to them. It also recommended tightening procedures for investigating excessive prescribing and the establishment of a voluntary limit on the amount of drugs supplied on a single prescription form.

==== Prescribing vs dispensing doctors ====
As part of its investigation, the committee studied the different arrangements for supplying drugs in urban and rural areas. The NHS was established with a Separation of prescribing and dispensing and pharmacists were reimbursed according to the rates listed in the Drug Tariff. Dispensing doctors in rural areas, however, could either be reimbursed on the same basis as pharmacists or opt for a capitation fee of ten shillings per patient per year, with additional payments for certain costly drugs and appliances. By 1959, around 2,220 of 2,700 dispensing doctors had chosen the capitation option.

Average prescribing costs, 1951–58:

Average prescribing costs per patient, 1951–58
Year	Dispensing doctors	Prescribing doctors
1951/52	15s 0d	£1 1s 1d
1952/53	14s 10d	£1 2s 6d
1953/54	15s 0d	£1 2s 0d
1954/55	16s 7d	£1 3s 8d
1955/56	18s 0d	£1 5s 8d
1956/57	18s 7d	£1 7s 5d
1957/58	£1 1s 4d	£1 10s 1d

The committee reported that the capitation system had constrained expenditure, noting that dispensing doctors consistently had lower average prescribing costs than their non-dispensing colleagues during the 1950s. It acknowledged, however, "serious objections" to incentive schemes such as the earlier Floating Sixpence, as patients might feel that doctors were being encouraged to economise at their expense. The committee also observed that some pharmacists and dispensing doctors had purchased drugs below reimbursement rates, thereby benefiting financially. While it accepted this was not inherently problematic, it suggested that the taxpayer should share in such savings.

While the Hinchcliffe Committee deliberated, NHS pharmaceutical expenditure continued to rise. The prescription charge of one shilling per item (introduced in December 1956) had not produced the expected savings, and the Voluntary Price Regulation Scheme (VPRS), introduced in April 1957, failed to achieve its planned £750,000 annual savings. As many of the committee’s recommendations were long-term, short-term measures were also sought. The VPRS was renegotiated in December 1960, and the prescription charge was doubled to two shillings (10p) per item in March 1961. These changes, however, again failed to deliver the anticipated reductions in costs.

=== 21st century ===
In 2015/16 health spending was 29.7% of the public services budget. This equated to an average rise in spending of about 4% a year over a 60-year period once inflation has been taken into account.

As of 2016, about 10% of GDP was spent on health and was the most spent in the public sector. In 2019, the UK spent roughly 10.2% of GDP on healthcare compared to 11.7% in Germany and 11.1% in France.

In 2016–2017, the budget was £122.5 billion. Under the Blair government spending levels increased by around 6% a year on average.

Between 2010 and 2017 spending growth was constrained to just over 1% a year. A 2019 report said that a study by the 'Centre for Health Economics' at the University of York found that between 2004/05 and 2016/17 the productivity of the NHS increased nearly two and a half times as quickly as the larger economy.

For the period between 2010 and 2018 the Health Foundation funded research by Birmingham University said there was insufficient and falling NHS capital spending that put patient care and put staff productivity at risk. The Health Foundation said that £3.5 billion more a year would be required to get capital spending to the OECD average. Spending limits were effecting service efficiency, and patient care. Shortages of equipment and equipment failures had an impact as did relying on ageing diagnostic equipment.

In 2018, British Prime Minister Theresa May announced that NHS in England would receive a 3.4% increase in funding every year to 2024, which would allow it to receive an extra £20bn a year in real terms funding. As part of the 2018 funding increase the UK Government asked the NHS in England to produce a 10-year plan as to how this funding would be used. In June 2018 the Institute for Fiscal Studies stated that a 5% real-terms increase was needed. Paul Johnson of the IFS said the 3.4% was greater than recent increases, but less than the long-term average.

In June 2018, there were calls for the government to write off the NHS debt. Saffron Cordery of NHS Providers said that hospitals needed help to do their work without being up in deficit, as two-thirds were in the year to 2018.

On 7 January 2019, the NHS England published the NHS Long Term Plan.

==== 2020s ====
The Guardian reported that data for 2020 suggests a change in NHS funding patterns. The BMA said this was largely due to raised spending during the pandemic and the effect of COVID-19 on the whole economy, since the GDP of the UK dropped more than that of all other G7 nations. The BMA also said in December 2022 that the NHS experienced "historical underfunding and under-resourcing" during the ten years before the onset of the COVID-19 pandemic.

In March 2025, Prime Minister Keir Starmer announced that the body that oversees National Health Service operations in England (NHS England) would be abolished in order to release bureaucratic pressures on the NHS and free up funding for more effective use within the service.

== Workforce ==
=== Early composition ===
The National Health Service was a major employer from its foundation. After nationalising Britain's voluntary and municipal hospitals, the new NHS took responsibility for 360,000 staff in England and Wales and a further 45,000 in Scotland. These included 9,000 full-time doctors (with thousands more consultants working in multiple part-time roles), 149,000 nurses and midwives (23,000 of whom were part-time), 128,000 ancillary staff (catering, laundry, cleaning and maintenance), 25,000 administrative and clerical staff, and 19,000 professional and technical staff, of whom the 2,800 physiotherapists, 1,600 laboratory technicians and 2,000 radiographers were the largest groups. This workforce would continue to grow throughout the 20th and 21st Centuries, overtaking the National Coal Board to become Britain's largest employer in 1961. By the end of the 1970s, the NHS had passed 1,000,000 staff and in 2015 was the world's fifth largest work organisation with 1.7m. Nurses are the largest single group of professionally qualified staff in the NHS, with 306,000 employed in English hospitals and community health services as at December 2020.

The NHS has long had one of Britain's most varied workforces, with employees from a diverse range of backgrounds in terms of class, occupation, gender, race and nationality. In the early NHS doctors were overwhelmingly men from middle and upper class backgrounds, and were often privately educated. Nurses in general hospitals were usually women and generally from a mixture of middle and working class origins. Men constituted a significant minority of nurses but were largely concentrated in mental hospitals, where their role historically had been more associated with manual labour, particularly the physical control of the patients. Professional organisations like the Royal College of Nursing tended to promote the idea that nurses were middle-class professionals, whilst trade unions encouraged nurses to see themselves as workers. Like nursing, ancillary tasks were also heavily gendered with portering and maintenance largely done by men, and laundry and cleaning largely women.

=== Staff numbers, sources and contracts ===
Increasing demand for health services led to a steady expansion in total staff numbers throughout the second half of the 20th century and into the 21st century. However, NHS wage rates were usually comparatively low and hours often long and anti-social. Consequently, under conditions of full employment in the 1950s and 1960s the NHS experienced regular recruitment crises in virtually all categories of staff, particularly doctors and nurses in some peripheral provincial areas. One solution adopted by health authorities was to encourage married nurses to return to the workforce part-time. In Britain, historically many nurses expected to leave work after getting married and into the 1960s senior nursing posts were disproportionately likely to be held by unmarried women. Nurse training also had a very high drop out rate, in part related to students leaving to get married (in addition to rejection by some of the strict discipline imposed on them). Part-time work brought many of these women back into the workforce and the NHS was a key site in the growth of this kind of work in post-war Britain, employing 65,000 part-time ancillary staff (mostly domestics) and 79,000 part-time nurses and midwives by 1967.

Alongside this rise in part-time work, hospitals increasingly looked overseas for staff, recruiting particularly heavily in Britain's colonies from the 1950s. By 1955, the Ministry of Health had official recruitment campaigns in 16 British colonies and former colonies. By 1965, there were more than 3,000 Jamaican nurses working in British hospitals and in 1977, 12% of student nurses and midwives came from overseas, 66% of them from the Caribbean, with substantial numbers also coming from the Philippines and South Asia. Large numbers of ancillary staff also migrated to fill NHS vacancies. Doctors were also recruited from across Britain's colonies and former colonies, particularly from India, Pakistan, Bangladesh and Sri Lanka. Doctors born and qualified overseas constituted 31% of all doctors in 1971. Nurses and doctors recruited by the NHS were often marginalised in job allocation. Early nurse migrants were often forced to re-validate their qualifications on arrival in Britain and instructed to take the less academic State Enrolled Nurse (SEN) training, rather than the more prestigious State Registered Nurse (SRN) qualification. SENs had worse pay and fewer promotion prospects. Similarly, employment discrimination often meant South Asian doctors were forced into less desirable posts in run-down provincial hospitals.

The NHS was also a site of expansion in new categories of scientific and technical workers. In 1967, the service employed 31,000 professional and technical staff connected with diagnosis and treatment, including audiologists, biochemists, dietitians, more than 9000 laboratory technicians, occupational therapists, physicists, physiotherapists, psychologists and radiographers. This category of staff had more than doubled in size ten years later, rising to 64,700 people or 6.5% of the total workforce. Although at the start of the period many of these roles had relatively informal career paths, with individuals sometimes recruited as assistants before training as technicians, from the 1970s onwards it became increasingly common for roles to have more formal training schemes and associated degree courses. Professional associations like the College of Occupational Therapists and the Association for Clinical Biochemistry and Laboratory Medicine became better organised and took a greater role both in regulating their professions and in collective bargaining with the Ministry of Health.

The 1980s saw further changes in the NHS' workforce. The Thatcher Government encouraged (and eventually forced) health authorities to put most ancillary services out for competitive tender, effectively outsourcing the jobs of those workers. This led to a substantial reduction in numbers, with one-third of ancillary posts disappearing between 1980 and 1987. Those that remained were largely employed by private agencies and no longer subject to national agreements or trade union collective bargaining. For nurses, the introduction of Project 2000 meant that their profession now centred around degree courses run by universities rather than nurse training courses run by teaching hospitals. This effectively removed student nurses from hospital workforces and helped raise the status of the profession. Much of the physical labour done by student nurses was now passed to a new category of health worker, the healthcare assistant, a role that mirrors that of "auxiliary nurses" in the early NHS. The status of general practitioners as outside contractors was largely confirmed by the market-based reforms introduced by the Thatcher, Major and Blair governments. The working lives of hospital doctors changed from the 1970s onwards, as career paths and work patterns became increasingly formalised. Set rules on hours were introduced in the 1970s and refined in the 1980s and 1990s to dramatically reduce the number of hours junior doctors were expected to contribute.

=== Industrial relations ===
==== 1948–72 ====
Between 1948 and 1972 the NHS largely remained free of strikes, but nevertheless did experience some other industrial disputes. The foundation of the service was opposed by many doctors, particularly general practitioners, who feared that a state medical service would reduce their independence. Doctors expressed this opposition through their largest professional organisation, the British Medical Association, which held a number of ballots canvassing its members' (largely negative) opinions on arrangements for the new service. After a threat to boycott the new service, the BMA secured some concessions from Aneurin Bevan, the Minister of Health responsible for implementing the NHS Act. The BMA's intransigence did not stop the new health service coming into being, but did secure the right to be paid on a "capitation" basis (per patient) rather than on a set salary. More importantly for doctors the government's concessions established the conventional wisdom in the Ministry of Health that changes to the NHS were impossible without the consent of the medical profession, effectively giving doctors a "medical veto". Winning consent from physicians remained a problem for health ministers, who faced regular complaints, particularly relating to pay. In 1962 the government gave up control over doctors' pay to the independent Review Body on Doctors' and Dentists' Remuneration.

The first dispute involving nurses took place when student nurses opened their first NHS pay packets in July 1948. Despite having received a modest pay rise, an increase in National Insurance contributions meant their take-home pay had gone down. Outraged students at St Mary's Hospital, Plaistow, Essex, organised a protest rally and a march, threatening to resign en masse if their demands for better pay, shorter hours and general improvements in conditions weren't met. The march made headlines but won few concessions from the Ministry of Health. Complaints from student nurses about poor conditions, long hours and low pay were common for much of the post-war period. Up to the 1970s, student nurses were responsible for as much as 75% of the physical labour on hospital wards and were often subject to intense disciplinary regimes both on the wards and in their private lives, with many student nurses living in strictly-supervised hospital nurses' accommodation.

The conflicts of 1947–48 were not very representative of the prevailing industrial relations culture in the NHS. Despite recurrent complaints about low pay and long hours, NHS staff were not prone to outbreaks of collective protest in the 1950s and 1960s. With the exception of an overtime ban and work-to-rule by administrative staff in 1957, organised by NALGO, and a go-slow by laundry workers in Carshalton in 1950, the NHS had little formal workplace conflict. Groups of miners, printers, dockers and car workers did stage a one-hour strike in solidarity with nurses' claims for pay increase in 1962, but the nurses' professional organisation the Royal College of Nursing (RCN) repudiated their actions and generally preferred to trade on respectability rather than militancy. At that time the RCN was reluctant to refer to itself as a trade union and nurses looking for more conventional workplace representation looked to the Confederation of Health Service Employees (COHSE) and the National Union of Public Employees (NUPE). The latter was generally strongest amongst ancillary staff and former amongst psychiatric nurses. Recognising the sensitive nature of hospital work both remained cautious regarding industrial action in the NHS until the 1970s, fearing that advocating action that might affect patients would drive away potential members. A combination of cautious organisations, staff who often saw their work as a vocation, and the domineering influence of doctors over the rest of the workforce, led to an "old colonial" system of industrial relations, structured largely by personal patronage and paternalism.

==== 1972–1979 ====
This largely broke down in the 1970s with unions like NUPE, COHSE and ASTMS recruiting large numbers of all categories of staff, and professional organisations like the RCN and BMA becoming more aggressive in collective bargaining. In December 1972, ancillary staff, the worst paid and most marginalised section of the workforce, organised mass demonstrations across the country with around 150,000 workers and supporters protesting poverty level wages. Action continued in March 1973 with ancillaries organising the NHS' first national strike. In the years to come other groups took action over similar issues, with nurses mounting a sustained campaign over pay in 1974 and radiographers following suit in 1975 under the slogan "no raise, no rays". Doctors also took strike action in 1975, with junior doctors walking out over long hours and inadequate pay for extra time and consultants taking action in defence of their right to place their private patients in NHS beds.

Although strikes in the NHS remained rare, changes in everyday industrial relations were more profound. The NHS saw a significant expansion in the number of workplace representatives in this period, sometimes forcing managers to consider the views of sections of the workforce, like the ancillary staff, who they had long ignored. This sometimes caused conflict between different groups. The "pay beds" dispute pitched nurses and ancillaries, who opposed private practice, against consultants, the direct beneficiaries of private practice. Other aspects of the upsurge in workplace activism were less controversial and all categories of staff were active in lobbying central government for better funding. The second half of the 1970s also saw a series of campaigns aimed at saving local hospitals, some of which involved "work-ins" where staff took over hospitals and continued to provide services after health authorities had shut them down. In November 1976, health workers took over Elizabeth Garrett Anderson Women's Hospital saving it from closure. The occupation of Hounslow Hospital in 1977 was less successful with the local authority forcibly removing the patients after two months.

By the end of the 1970s, industrial relations in the NHS were widely considered to be in crisis, with poor management and inadequate personnel procedures causing endemic conflict in a substantial minority of hospitals. The participation of large numbers of health workers in the events of 1978–79 Winter of Discontent was one reflection of this. Ambulance drivers and ancillary staff were both involved in strikes over pay in January 1979, reducing 1,100 hospitals to emergency services only and causing widespread disruption to ambulance services.

==== 1980–2010 ====
As in other sectors, industrial relations under the Thatcher Government continued to be a conflict. Successive health ministers looked to hold down pay in the public sector and to outsource ancillary staff where possible. Following the 1983 Griffiths Report, the NHS also tried to import a business model more similar to the private sector with professional managers taking over cost control, reducing the power of the medical profession. There were disputes over all of these policies. In 1982 there was another conflict over pay restraint involving ancillaries and nurses. Campaigning by NUPE, COHSE and RCN won an interim pay rise for nurses who were also granted their own independent pay review body, as the doctors had been 20 years earlier. The status and pay for registered nurses subsequently tended to improve, particularly when nurse education was shifted to university degree courses under Project 2000 in 1986.

Ancillary staff, in contrast, were increasingly marginalised during the 1980s. The Conservative Government put pressure on health authorities to outsource their catering, cleaning, laundry and maintenance services to private companies. Trade unions fought these policies, in some cases successfully, but many hospital services finally ended up in private hands, sometimes with companies who refused to recognise trade unions. Outsourcing dissipated some of the influence unions had built up during the 1970s and towards the end of decade increasingly occupied many shop stewards in detailed negotiations over grading and contract details rather than recruitment and organising.

Doctors' relationship with the government deteriorated during the 1980s. The advance of managerialism under Griffiths irritated many doctors, previously accustomed to a dominant role in NHS governance. By 1989 doctors were extremely hostile to government reforms and were active in lobbying against the implementation of the 1989 government white paper, Working for Patients, which introduced an internal market to the NHS. Their defence of public ownership and opposition to market-based reforms marked a substantial shift from doctors' original opposition to the NHS, reflecting how far doctors' mindsets had changed in relation to state medicine.

Relations between the NHS and the government were generally much improved under the Blair Government. Substantial investment in staff and new facilities were appreciated by many nurses and doctors, although there were concerns about the introduction of private sector suppliers, the use of public–private partnerships to fund much investment and the development of an intensive culture of achievement targets. There was also no attempt to reverse the outsourcing of ancillary services, something health service unions linked to recurrent crises over hospital cleanliness.

==== 2010 onwards ====
Between 2010 and 2017, there was a cap of 1% on pay rises for staff continuing in the same role. In 2017, the pay rise was likely to be below the level of inflation and to mean a real-terms pay cut. Unions representing doctors, dentists, nurses and other health professionals called on the government to end the cap on health service pay.

In 2018, the Royal College of Physicians surveyed doctors across the UK, with two-thirds maintaining patient safety had deteriorated during the year to 2018: 80% feared they would be unable to provide safe patient care in the coming year while 84% felt that increased pressure on the NHS was demoralising the workforce.

In May 2018 it was reported that the NHS was under-resourced compared to health provisions in other developed nations. A King's Fund study of OECD data from 21 nations, revealed that the NHS has among the lowest numbers of doctors, nurses and hospital beds per capita in the western world. In May 2018, it was said that nurses within the NHS said that patient care was compromised by the shortage of nurses and the lack of experienced nurses with the necessary qualifications. In June 2018 it was reported that the NHS performed below average in preventing deaths from cancer, strokes and heart disease.

Brexit, in 2020, was predicted to affect medical practitioners from EU countries who worked in the NHS, accounting for more than 1-in-10 doctors at the time. A 2017 survey suggested 60% of these doctors were considering leaving, with a record 17,197 EU staff leaving the NHS in 2016. The figures led to calls to reassure European workers over their future in the UK.

== Cultural history of the NHS ==
=== Film and television ===
Film and television have played important roles in forming cultural understandings of the National Health Service. Hospitals and GP practices, in particular, have been repeatedly dramatised as locations that lend themselves to displaying wider life stories – love, birth, ageing, dying, friendships and feuds. The NHS has also been an important topic within public health, often forming a central part in public information films about health and wellbeing.

==== Public information films ====
From the launch of the National Health Service in 1948, film was used as an important cultural tool for spreading governmental health messages. During the Second World War, film grew in popularity as a way for the British government to keep citizens informed, impart advice and help raise morale on the Home Front. This commitment to producing public information films continued after the end of the War in 1945 with the newly formed Central Office of Information taking responsibility for the production of these films. This ensured that the launch of the NHS was accompanied by a number of public information films shown nationwide during Spring and Summer 1948. Three main films were produced – Charley: You're Very Good Health (Halas & Batchelor, 1948), Here's Health (Douglas Alexander, 1948) and Doctor's Dilemma (Unknown, 1948). These films introduced the NHS in three distinct ways with Charley: You're Very Good Health focused on explaining how the NHS would work upon its launch in a light-hearted manner with Charley standing in as the 'everyman' within the film's narrative. The film used a series of 'suppose' scenarios to outline how the new NHS system would work in practice in comparison to the pre-NHS health care system. Here's Health instead employed the narrative techniques of melodrama to dramatise one family's response to a household accident and the sudden need for medical attention during the Christmas of 1947. It uses flash-forwards to show how these types of care and the cost of it will be altered by the introduction of the NHS. The third main film used to advertise the launch of the NHS was a much briefer, information short, centred on the use of voice-over and a combination of still and moving images to encourage members of the public to register with an NHS GP before the National Health Service Act came into force on 5 July 1948.

==== Popular films and television ====
Within a few years of the NHS, popular fictional films were beginning to focus on the NHS as a location for dramatic narratives. Films such as White Corridors (Pat Jackson, 1951) and Mandy (Alexander MacKendrick, 1952), shown within the early years of the NHS, showed day-to-day life in an NHS hospital as well as dealing with specific single-issue topics such as deafness within postwar British society. The Doctor series, starring firstly Dirk Bogarde and later Leslie Philips, took a comedic look at the antics of a young doctor in an NHS hospital and the Carry On comedies Carry On Nurse (Gerald Thomas, 1959), Carry On Doctor (Gerald Thomas, 1967) and Carry On Matron (Gerald Thomas, 1972) also used comic situations within the NHS hospital to poke fun at both the NHS as an institution and the capers of doctors, nurses and patients alike. From the late 1950s, the NHS also became an important subject within the wider history of British soap operas. Emergency – Ward 10 was first broadcast in 1957 on ITV and ran until 1967 and followed the life and loves of the staff and patients of the fictionalised Oxbridge General. ITV later followed this up with General Hospital which borrowed much from Emergency Ward 10 in terms of its themes and focus.

The idea of a medical hospital as a suitable and popular setting for a soap opera continued to take root in the 1980s. Casualty, set in an A&E department, was first broadcast in 1986 and has since become the longest running medical drama in the world. At a time when controversy over the NHS was high on the public agenda, Paul Unwin and Jeremy Brock began their proposal for Casualty by declaring that 'In 1948 a dream was born: a National Health Service. In 1985 the dream is in tatters.' This politicised agenda remained in evidence during the first three series of Casualty, with the programme showing how those who fictionally worked for the NHS were also dissatisfied with the new direction of the service. During the 1990s television began more overtly showing medical practitioners who were critical or cynical of the NHS. In particular, Cardiac Arrest, broadcast on BBC 1, utilised this type of cynicism within its narrative plots.

Television has also forged a place for the NHS within reality television programming. In particular 24 Hours in A&E and One Born Every Minute have adopted medical documentary formats to show the inner workings of particular NHS hospital departments. Fly-on-the-wall footage is interwoven with interviews with patients, staff and relatives as they give their perspectives on the medical cases shown in each episode.

=== Comedy ===
Comedy films, books, and cartoons have been produced about the NHS. These have shaped as well as reflected how people think about this institution.

==== Cartoons ====
There have been lots of cartoons about the NHS throughout the institution's history. Even before the NHS was launched, there were cartoons documenting the political debates about its form. In the 1940s, the British Medical Association was opposed to the idea of doctors becoming state employees on fixed salaries. Cartoonists made their opinions about this conflict known. David Low published a cartoon in the Evening Standard on 14 December 1944 showing Charles Hill, the BMA Secretary, being examined by a doctor. The doctor states, 'Don't be alarmed. Whatever's the trouble, you're not going to die from enlargement of the social conscience.'

When the NHS was launched, many cartoons showed how people responded to the NHS being free at the point of access. One cartoon, published in 1951 by Antonia Yeoman, portrayed women in a doctor's waiting room, one of whom stated that she had seen eighteen doctors and seven psychiatrists. Eventually, she had been diagnosed with a 'deep-seated guilt about getting things free from the National Health Service.' Analysing cartoons about health featured in Punch magazine from 1948, the psychiatrist Bernard Zeitlyn argues that they 'centred on the bonanza of free spectacles, beards and trips abroad' that the NHS would bring. Cartoonists also portrayed public excitement about the availability of free wigs on the NHS. In one such example, from January 1949, cartoonist Joseph Lee showed an irate man chasing a child, asking, 'Who's been practising Home Perms on my free National Health Service wig?'

Cartoons were also used to criticise NHS policy. From 1948, Zeitlyn also found cartoons portraying concern about the 'bureaucratic consequences' of the NHS. The number of critical cartoons about NHS policy increased from the 1960s, as the NHS faced cuts, and the satire movement emerged in Britain. In December 1960, cartoonist Victor Weisz drew an image for the Evening Standard showing Minister for Health Enoch Powell as a surgeon covered in blood, accusing him of making too many cuts. Other cartoonists suggested that too much was being spent on the NHS. For example, in the Daily Mail in 1968, John Musgrave-Wood drew a man to portray the NHS, who was wearing a dunce's cap and being fed 'Defence Cuts'. Many cartoons have been very interested in portraying NHS staff, both their lives and industrial conflict. The cartoonist Carl Giles, who often drew for the Daily Express, was very interested in drawing nurses in particular. Historian Jack Saunders has argued that Giles' presentation shifted from presenting nurses from 'caring and sexualised' to 'bolshie and assertive'. Giles sent a cartoon of nurses stealing peas from patients directly to the East Suffolk Nurses League. On the cartoon, Giles wrote 'with deepest sympathy', referring to the cutting of food allowances.

==== Humour as an ailment ====
Researchers and clinicians hope that humour and laughter may be able to be used to improve human health. The term 'gelotology', to denote the study of laughter, was created in 1964 by Edith Trager and W. F. Fry. One experiment from 2011, led by researchers at the University of Oxford, suggested that watching comedy videos may raise people's pain thresholds, when watched in a group. This effect did not hold when videos were watched alone, or if research participants watched videos such as scenes of nature. In 2003, the artist Nicola Green and film-maker Lara Agnew created a 'laughter booth' at the Royal Brompton Hospital. In this booth, patients and staff could watch videos of people laughing. The idea of laughter as healing has also influenced language, through the phrase 'laughter is the best medicine'.

== See also ==
- Healthcare in England
- Healthcare in Northern Ireland
- Healthcare in Scotland
- Healthcare in Wales
- History of public health in the United Kingdom
