= National Association of Sessional GPs =

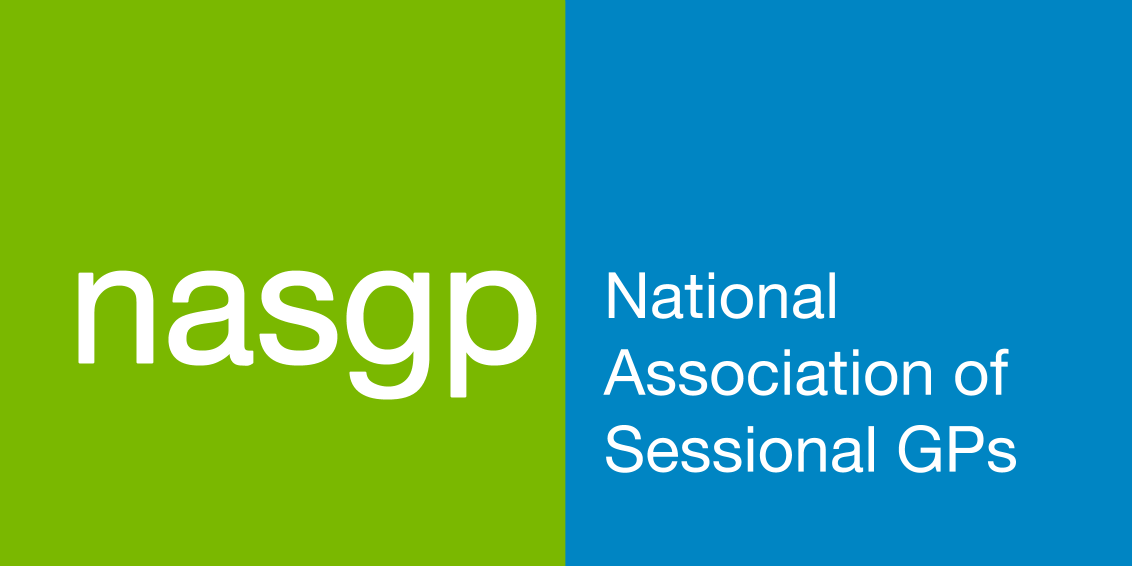
- Established: 1997
- Headquarters: Chichester, West Sussex
- Location: United Kingdom
- Members: 4,250 (Winter 2018)
- Chairman: Dr Richard Fieldhouse
- Website: Official website

== History and activities ==
The National Association of Sessional GPs (NASGP) was founded 1997 by a group of sessional GPs (independent general practitioners) with the aim of representing all fully qualified GPs working as locums, assistants, salaried GPs, returners and retainers. The organisation was originally named the National Association of Non-Principals (NANP).

The organisation has a chairman, quality lead and business manager, and publishes The Sessional GP, a bimonthly magazine on topics relating to sessional GPs. It also acts as an umbrella organisation for approximately 100 local sessional GP groups and GP locum chambers.

In 2015, the NASGP launched AppraisalAid, which is an online suite of information and templates specifically aimed at enabling freelance GP locums to keep record their reflections in preparation for their annual NHS appraisal. In 2016, the NASGP launched two new resources aimed at reducing waste in the National Health Service. The first was the online Standardised Practice Information Portal (Spip), replacing its paper predecessor (Standardised Practice Induction Pack), followed in autumn 2016 by the NASGP's online locum GP invoicing and booking system called LocumDeck.

In 2020, NASGP relaunched its membership packages to include NASGP Locum Chambers membership, a complete model for GP locum support via a local collective of self-employed locums with a dedicated manager and clinical director.

A platform co-developed by NASGP, GP in the Cloud, won the Health Service Journal’s 2024 Virtual Care Award. The platform also won a silver award for Healthcare Provider Partnership at the same awards event.

NASGP holds regional partnerships with several integrated care systems in England including NHS Buckinghamshire, Oxfordshire and Berkshire West Integrated Care Board, NHS Frimley Integrated Care Board, NHS Hertfordshire and West Essex Integrated Care Board, NHS Mid and South Essex Integrated Care Board, NHS Suffolk and North East Essex Integrated Care Board and NHS Gloucestershire Integrated Care Board.

=== LocumDeck ===
With an estimated 17,000 locum GPs working in the UK, most of them working independently, the NASGP has recognised the complexity of individuals managing their workload by creating a sophisticated online platform to easily manage their workload. In particular, locums wishing to make use of the NHS superannuation scheme must use relatively complex claim forms called Locum Form As (for each individual practice every month) and a monthly Locum Form B as a record of all superannuable income from that month.

LocumDeck was named Digital Platform of the Year at Cogora’s 2023 General Practice Awards.

== Aims and objectives ==
The group represents sessional GPs at a national level, provides support for members and for local sessional GP groups and chambers. The NASGP is involved in lobbying other medical organisations to ensure equitable representation of sessional GPs.

Dr Richard Fieldhouse spoke on a panel at the British Medical Association’s sessional GP conference in 2023. He has represented sessional GPs at industry events by Pulse and Medscape UK. NASGP ran a stream for sessional GPs that featured a talk by Dr Tony Avery, NHS England’s National Clinical Director for Prescribing, at Medscape UK’s Guidelines Live 2023.

Dr Fieldhouse has commented on GP issues in the national press including the BBC.

Chairmen

Dr Mike Uprichard (2006 - 2008)
Dr Cath Sheperd (2003 - 2006)
Dr Richard Fieldhouse (2008–present)
