= General medical services =

Healthcare provided by GPs in the UK

General medical services (GMS) is the range of healthcare that is provided by general practitioners (GPs or family doctors) as part of the National Health Service in the United Kingdom. The NHS specifies what GPs, as independent contractors, are expected to do and provides funding for this work through arrangements known as the General Medical Services Contract. Today, the GMS contract is a UK-wide arrangement with minor differences negotiated by each of the four UK health departments. In 2013 60% of practices had a GMS contract as their principal contract. The contract has sub-sections and not all are compulsory. The other forms of contract are the Personal Medical Services or Alternative Provider Medical Services contracts. They are designed to encourage practices to offer services over and above the standard contract. Alternative Provider Medical Services contracts, unlike the other contracts, can be awarded to anyone, not just GPs, don't specify standard essential services, and are time limited. A new contract is issued each year.

Normal working hours of 8 am to 6.30 pm Monday to Friday are specified in the contract.

== History of the contract ==
National contracting of general medical (general practitioner) services can be traced to the National Insurance Act 1911 which introduced a pool (similar to today's "global sum") to pay GPs on a capitation system building on the traditions of the friendly society.

The scheme was administered by local insurance committees covering counties and conurbations which held a panel of doctors prepared to work under the scheme. The panel doctors were subject to "terms of service" which were later lifted directly into the NHS GP contract. Lloyd George's "nationalisation of club medicine and local insurance in 1912 was the progenitor of the NHS in 1948". Lloyd George, when proposing to increase from 6 to 9 shillings per head the proposed annual payment to panel GPs insisted: "If the remuneration is increased, the service must be improved. Up to the present the doctor has not been adequately paid, and therefore we have had no right or title to expect him to give full service. In a vast number of cases he has given his services for nothing or for payment which was utterly inadequate. There is no man here who does not know doctors who have been attending poor people without any fee or reward at all".

In 1924 agreement was reached between the British Medical Association and the Ministry of Health that capitation fees would comprise 50% of a GPs income but only occupy 2/7 of his time, the remaining income being generated privately.

The meaning of independent contractor in respect of GPs has not always been very clear, but was generally tied to their rejection of salaried status. It has been argued that their behaviour has rarely been that of self-employed entrepreneurs, but rather that of salaried professionals who emphasise and defend the importance of their autonomy.

GPs' contract arrangements were originally made with local executive councils, and then their successors family practitioner committees, family health service authorities and primary care trusts. In England the contract is now between the GP practice and NHS England. In Scotland GP practices are contracted by the health boards. It was agreed in August 2014 that GPs in Scotland would have a separate contract with negotiations taking place which would come into force from 2017/18. It is proposed that they should give up employing practice staff and move 'as far towards salaried model as possible without losing independent status'.

== Early years of the NHS ==
The Beveridge Report of 1942 gave the impetus for White Paper under the Conservative Health Minister Henry Willink that supported the idea of salaried GP services in health centres. The 1946 National Insurance Act under Labour Health Minister Aneurin Bevan, which laid the foundation for the NHS, reduced the clinical role of GPs in hospitals and their involvement in public health issues. The capitation fees was based on the number of patients the GP had on his list. Proposals to make GPs salaried professionals were rejected by the profession in 1948. In 1951 the capitation started to be based on the number of doctors, rather than patients.

From 1948 to 2004 the contract was an individual one. Virtually every doctor working in general practice had a personal contract with the local NHS and patients were registered with a named doctor. There was a clause which stated "a doctor is responsible for ensuring the provision for his patients of the services referred to … throughout each day during which his name is included in the … medical list".

In 1953, general practitioners were estimated to be making between 12 and 30 home visits each day and seeing between 15 and 50 patients in their surgeries.

The College of General Practitioners was founded in November 1952, and became an increasingly important player in negotiations about the GP contract. It became a driving force in developing postgraduate training for doctors wishing to enter general practice.

== 1966 GP contract ==
In 1965 GPs demanded a new contract and threatened mass resignation from the NHS. One of their complaints was that there was no provision for improvement of practices. A GP who employed a secretary or nurse was paid no more than others who did the minimum. The main problem, however, was in comparison to the pay and status of hospital consultants. The career earnings of a consultant at that time were 48% higher than those of a GP. The Socialist Medical Association complained that the role of the family doctor as the lynch-pin of the NHS, as intended in the NHS Act had not been fulfilled. The reverse position had gradually developed, and general practice, was now frequently described as a "cottage industry". The BMA formulated a Charter for the Family Doctor Service. It demanded: "To give the best service to his patients, the family doctor must:

- Have adequate time for every patient.
- Be able to keep up to date.
- Have complete clinical freedom.
- Have adequate, well-equipped premises.
- Have at his disposal all the diagnostic aids, social services and ancillary help he needs.
- Be encouraged to acquire skills and experience in special fields.
- Be adequately paid by a method acceptable to him which encourages him to do his best for his patients.
- Have a working day which leaves him some time for leisure".

The resulting 1966 contract addressed major grievances of GPs and provided for better equipped and better staffed premises (subsidised by the state), greater practitioner autonomy, a basic practice allowance for any GP principal with a list of more than 1000 patients, and pension provisions. Fees for service were introduced for interventions related to the prevention of disease. There was considerable pressure from doctors for the introduction of charges to patients but the Minister, Kenneth Robinson and the leadership of the BMA resisted this. Despite some changes, the capitation principle and the pool survived. The new payment system, known as the red book, allowed doctors to claim back from the NHS 70% of staff costs and 100% of the cost of their premises. Maternity Services and contraception were optional services which attracted additional payments. GPs were allowed to practise privately, to hold part-time hospital or other appointments within the NHS, to work in industry or for an insurance company, although few did very much private work.

In 1976 parliament approved legislation requiring doctors who wanted to become principals in general practice to complete vocational training.

== 1990 GP contract ==
The Conservative government under Margaret Thatcher from 1979 onwards looked for ways of changing the NHS, with a greater role of the private sector, and for limiting health spending and it was not afraid to take on the doctor's trade union, the British Medical Association (BMA). The 1990 contract which was imposed by Kenneth Clarke after it was rejected in a ballot, linked GP pay more strongly to performance. More money was attached to capitation and less to the basic practice allowance, in line with the Thatcher government's general enthusiasm for competition – an enthusiasm which was not shared by many GPs. The number of professional members on the family health services authority was considerably fewer than had been the case with the family practitioner committee. The terms and conditions of primary medical service delivery were closely specified. The 'Red Book' (Statement of Fees and Allowances) detailed the payment tariffs for each individual treatment. Targets were set for cervical smears and immunisations. GPs were required to give health checks to new patients, patients over 75 and those who had not seen a GP for 3 years.

The GP Fundholding scheme gave them a budget for commissioning for the first time. The government also introduced a new locally negotiated personal services contract for general practitioners in 1997, permitting them to be salaried, paid by the session, or work as locums.

== The 2004 GMS contract ==
The new GMS contract came into force in April 2004, abolished the "Red Book" and led to a significant but temporary increase in some practices' income. Every practice gets a share of a total amount of money allocated towards primary care in GMS practices (the "Global Sum"). This share is determined by the practice's list size, adjusted for age and sex of the patients (children, women and the elderly have higher weights than young men because they cause a greater workload). Furthermore, the practice gets an adjustment for rurality (greater rurality causes greater expenses), for the cost of employing staff (the "Market Forces Factor"), which captures differences in pay rates between areas, (e.g., it is more expensive to hire a nurse in London than in Perth), the rate of "churn" of the patient list and for morbidity as measured by the Health Survey for England.

The application of the formula to this reduced "Global Sum" would have resulted in great changes in GP income and income loss for many GPs and through their representative organisations the GPs were able to extract a concession. They received a "Minimum Practice Income Guarantee", which temporarlily protected the previous income levels of those who would otherwise have lost out – that guarantee being withdrawn over time by a combination of inflation and the clawback of pay rises.

At the same time the Government introduced the Quality and Outcomes Framework (QOF) which was designed to give GPs the incentive to do more work and fulfil government-set requirements (146 indicators) to earn points (varying amounts per indicator) which translate into greater income. The money for the QOF was taken out of the "Global Sum", so is not really new extra money.

Participation in the QOF is voluntary but since the standards change each year, practically all practices participating have to do more work each year for the same income. However, the substantial additional workload of QOF has led to substantial improvements in the screening for risk factors in the community by primary care, particularly for older patients with cardiovascular disease.

The Working in Partnership Programme (WiPP) was launched under the 2004 contract to support doctors in general practice by providing them with innovative ideas on how to improve services for the public.

The new contract forced almost all GPs to opt-out of weekend and night out-of-hours service provision – largely because the cost of providing a good quality service was roughly double the funding allocated to it by the patient, but also because the government set standards (all calls to be answered within 60 seconds etc.) that cannot be met by individuals. The inevitable consequences of systematic underfunding of primary care OOH services and their provision by the cheapest bidder came to a head with the Dr Ubani case, although there have been many others. It should perhaps stand as a warning of the risks inherent in the "lowest bid cheapest provider" model of medical care.

A series of amendments have followed each year – each time reducing income for the current workload, and tying existing pay to new targets (adding new QoF indicators, making them harder to meet, extending working hours). This combined with the other workload factors (increasing consultation length, increasing consultation frequency, ageing population (see Office for National Statistics) increasing medical complexity, and transfer of work from hospital means that GP workload is rising 5% year on year as GP income falls – concealed largely by the rise of "half-time GPs" working 40 hours a week which makes pay look artificially high.

== The 2015 contract ==
The contract changes for 2015/16 in England were announced in September 2014 and formulated in the National Health Service (General Medical Services Contracts) Regulations 2015 (SI 2016/1862). Main changes included a named, accountable GP for all patients, publication of GPs' average net earnings and expansion and improvement of online services. Practices have to help anyone who wants it to sign up for patient-facing services. All practices were required to have a patient participation group According to Jeremy Hunt the right to a named GP turned into a tick-box exercise as there were not enough GPs.

== The 2017 contract ==
GP practices in England will receive £85.35 per weighted patient under the 2017 Contract, an increase of 5.9% from 2016/17.

== The 2019 contract ==
The 2019 contract will run for 5 years. £405 million of funding has been confirmed for 2019/20. The contract provides changes to the rurality index payment and London adjustment payment, so that rurality index payments will only apply to patients living inside a GP's catchment area and the London adjustment payment will only apply to patients actually living in London. Babylon Health complained that this penalised their GP at Hand operation which had invested in technology in order to serve patients over a wide geographic area. According to the BMA the deal will guarantee a minimum 2% uplift for GP and staff pay and expenses this year.

- There is an incentive of £2 a patient for practices to join geographically based primary care networks.
- There will be funding for pharmacists, physiotherapists, paramedics, physician associates and social prescribing support workers to support practices.
- Practices will be obliged to make one appointment per 3,000 patients available per day for direct booking by NHS 111. Richard Vautrey described the changes as the most significant in 15 years.
- For the first time State indemnity is extended to GPs and practice staff.
- Practices are banned from advertising or hosting private services.

== The Carr-Hill formula ==
Capitation payments, which make up about 60% of a typical practice's income, are calculated using a formula developed by Professor Roy Carr-Hill. "This formula takes into consideration, along with other practice characteristics, individual patients' age, gender and health conditions and calculates a "weighted" count of patients according to need. This means that two practices with the same number of patients may have very different weighted patient numbers due to widely varying patient characteristics and health conditions, and as a result, these practices which may seem to be similar in terms of list size, could receive very different levels of funding".

This includes patient age and gender which is used to reflect frequency of home and surgery visits, Standardized mortality ratio and Standardised Long-Standing Illness for patients under 65, the number of newly registered patients, numbers of residential and nursing home patients, rurality and the cost of living, particularly in London.

In 2019 GPs were paid around £150 on average for each patient on their list. In 2018 3.6 million more patients were registered in England than the population. The NHS Counter Fraud Authority is to investigate where registered patients have not visited their doctor for five years. Richard Vautrey said "Some of these will be people that have recently died, or left the country, others may be homeless or simply unaccounted for in government statistics, and we would be concerned at any suggestion that any discrepancies are down to wilful deception by hard-working GPs."

== Other primary care contracts ==
Apart from GPs in the GMS, primary care is also provided through Personal Medical Services (PMS) and Alternative Provider Medical Services (APMS) contracts.

Personal Medical Services (PMS) were first tried in April 1998 and became a permanent option in April 2004. The health care professional/health care body and the primary care trust (PCT) enter a local contract. The main use of this contract is to give GPs the option of being salaried. Alternative Provider Medical Services (APMS) are primary care services provided by outside contractors (like US health companies).

A study, published by the Journal of the Royal Society of Medicine in 2015 found that 347 of the 8,300 general practices in England were run by under 'alternative provider medical service' contracts. The study found the introduction of the alternative contract had not led to improvements in quality and may have resulted in worse care. The results showed that APMS providers performed significantly worse across 13 out of the 17 indicators (p=<0.01 in each) in each year from 2008/09 and 2012/13, and were significantly worse than traditional general practice in three out of the five years for a further two indicators.

== Profitability ==
In 2013/4 the average gross earnings of a single handed GP was £107,200. In practices with six or more GPs the average was £99,100.
