= Healthcare in England =

Overview of the health care system in England

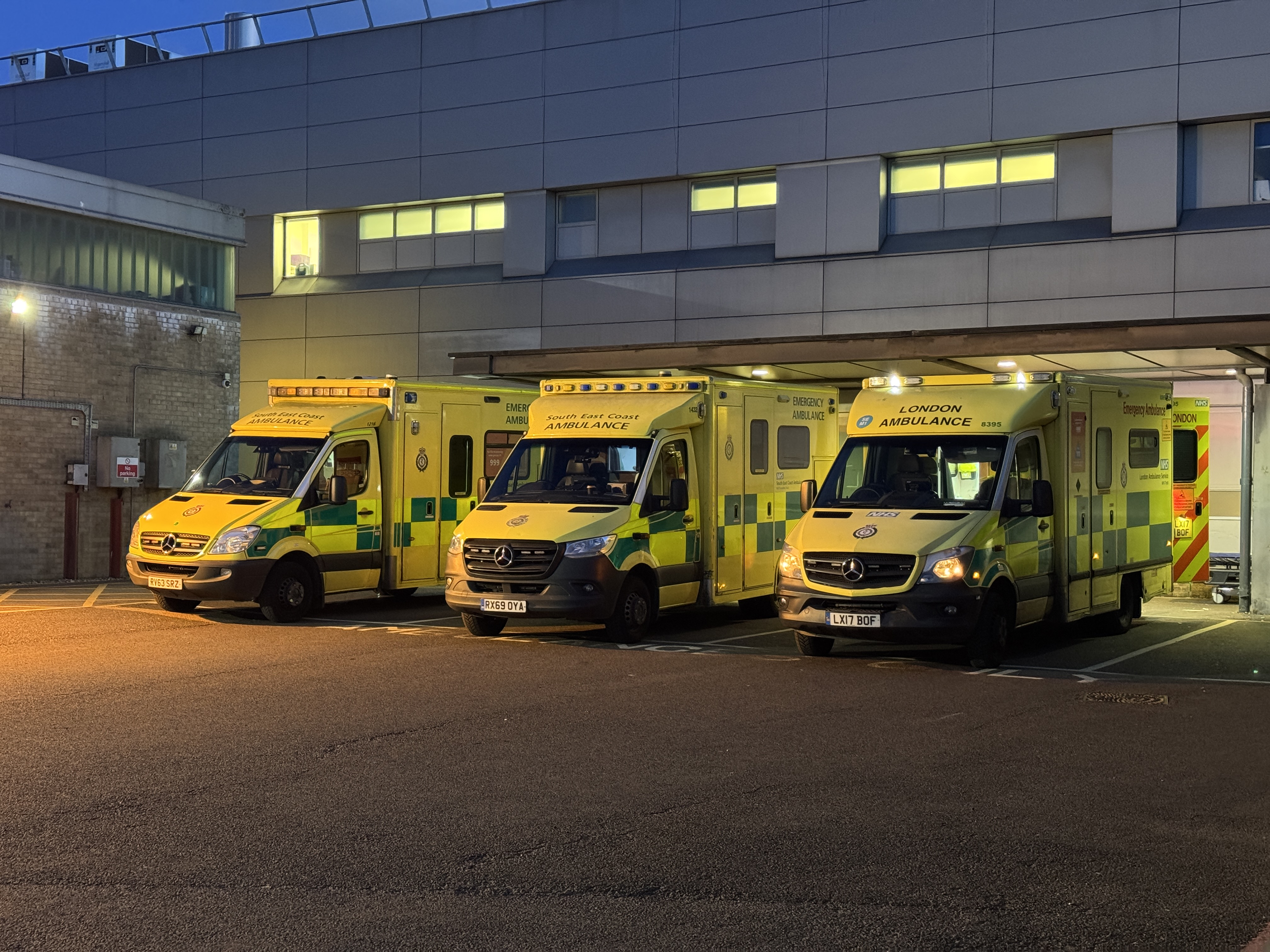
Ambulances outside Darent Valley Hospital in Kent

Healthcare in England is mainly provided by the National Health Service (NHS), a public body that provides healthcare to all permanent residents in England, that is free at the point of use.

The body is one of four forming the UK National Health Service, as health is a devolved matter; there are differences with the provisions for healthcare elsewhere in the United Kingdom, and in England it is overseen by NHS England. Though the public system dominates healthcare provision in England, private health care and a wide variety of alternative and complementary treatments are available for those willing and able to pay.

The Secretary of State for Health and Social Care is a senior minister of the Crown within the Government of the United Kingdom, and leads the Department of Health and Social Care with responsibility for England's NHS. The Secretary serves as the principal adviser to the prime minister of the United Kingdom on all health matters.

== National Health Service ==
The NHS is free at the point of use for the patient though there are charges associated with eye tests, dental care, prescriptions, and many aspects of personal care.

The NHS provides the major part of healthcare in England, including primary care, in-patient care, long-term healthcare, ophthalmology and dentistry. The National Health Service Act 1946 came into effect on 5 July 1948. Private health care has continued parallel to the NHS, paid for largely by private insurance, but it is used by less than 8% of the population, and generally as a top-up to NHS services. Recently there have been some examples where unused private sector capacity has been used to increase NHS capacity and in some cases the NHS has commissioned the private sector to establish and run new facilities on a sub contracted basis. The involvement of the private sector remains relatively small and according to one survey by the BMA, a large proportion of the public oppose such involvement.

=== Common features ===
The NHS uses General Practitioners (GPs) to provide primary healthcare and to make referrals to further services as necessary. Hospitals then provide more specialist services, including care for patients with psychiatric illnesses, as well as direct access to Accident and Emergency (A&E) departments. Pharmacists are able to prescribe medication. Community pharmacies are privately owned but have contracts with the national health service to supply prescription drugs.

The public healthcare system also provides free (at the point of service) ambulance services for emergencies, when patients need the specialist transport only available from ambulance crews or when patients are not fit to travel home by public transport. These services are generally supplemented when necessary by the voluntary ambulance services (British Red Cross, St Andrews Ambulance Association and St John Ambulance). In specific emergencies, emergency air transport is also provided by naval, military and air force aircraft of whatever type might be appropriate or available on each occasion.

Dentists can only charge NHS patients at the set rates. Dental care is free for patients under 18 years old (19 if still in full-time education), with certain medical conditions, on low incomes or in receipt of welfare benefits. About half of the income of dentists in England comes from work sub-contracted from the NHS, however not all dentists choose to do NHS work.

In England, a fixed NHS prescription charge is payable for up to a three-month supply of each item (£9.35 as of April 2022), regardless of actual cost. There are many exemptions from the charge, including patients under 16 years old (18 if still in full-time education), over 60, with certain medical conditions, on low incomes or in receipt of welfare benefits. Permanent residents in England who are liable to pay prescription charges can purchase a Prescription Prepayment Certificate (PPC) covering all prescriptions in a specified period.

When purchasing drugs, the NHS has significant market power that, based on its own assessment of the fair value of the drugs, influences the global price, typically keeping prices lower. Several other countries either copy the UK's model or directly rely on the country's assessments for their own decisions on state-financed drug reimbursements.

=== Commissioning ===
Integrated care systems (ICSs) were put on a statutory footing in England on 1 July 2022 by the Health and Care Act 2022, replacing clinical commissioning groups. A total of 42 ICSs across England now plan and coordinate services, with aims including better integration and reducing health inequalities.

=== Funding and management ===
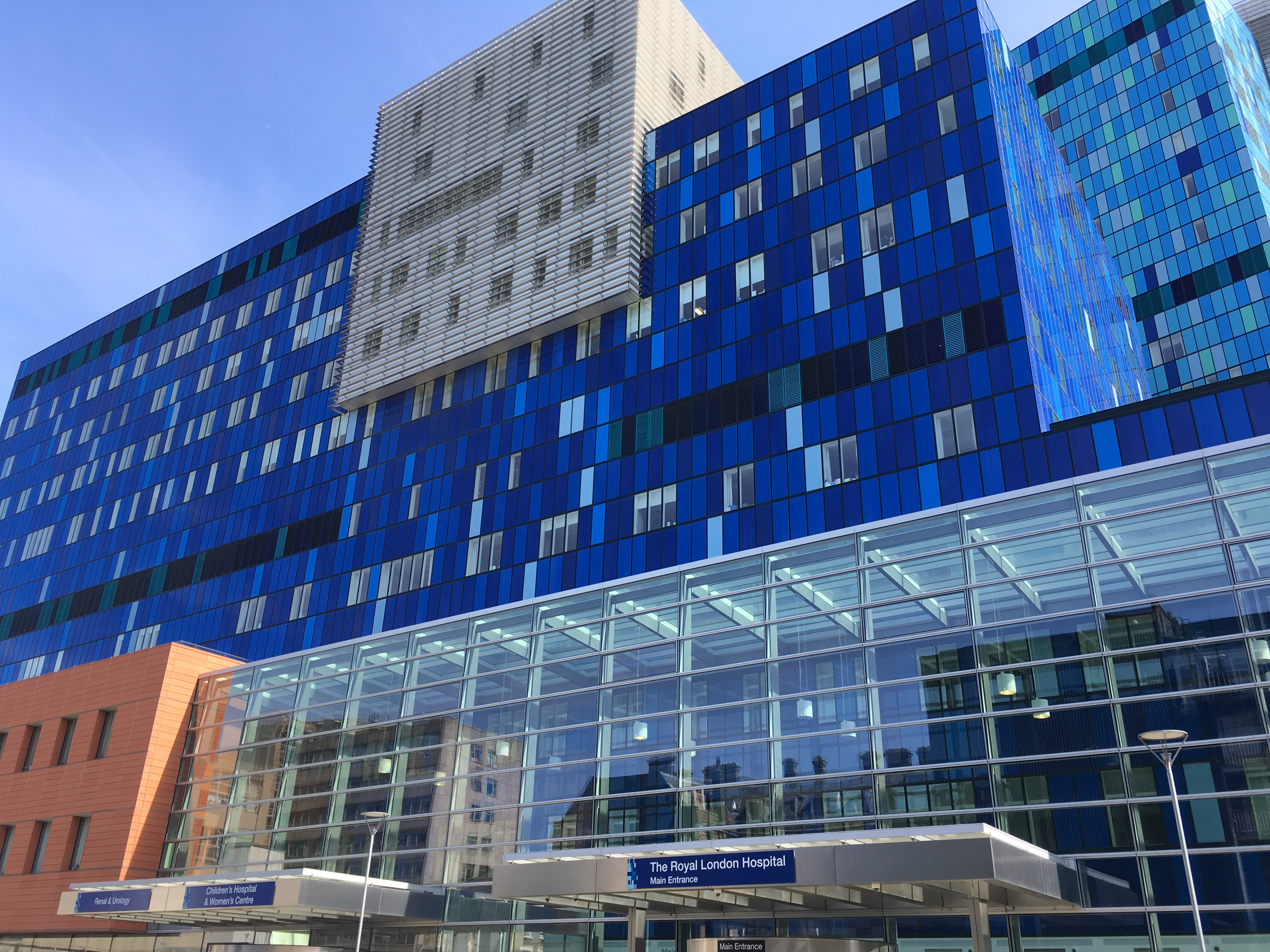
Royal London Hospital, a large teaching hospital. The hospital's rooftop helipad is the London Air Ambulance operating base.

The NHS is divided conceptually into two parts, covering primary and secondary care, with trusts given the task of healthcare delivery. There are two main kinds of trusts in the NHS reflecting purchaser/provider roles: commissioning trusts are responsible for examining local needs and negotiating with providers to provide healthcare services to the local population, and provider trusts which are NHS bodies delivering healthcare service. Commissioning trusts negotiate service delivery with providers that may be NHS bodies or private entities. They will be involved in agreeing major capital and other healthcare spending projects in their region.

By far the most known and most important purchases are services including general practice physician services (most of whom are private businesses working under exclusive contract to the NHS), community nursing, local clinics and mental health service. For most people, the majority of healthcare is delivered in a primary care setting. Provider trusts are care deliverers, the main examples being the hospital trusts and the ambulance trusts which spend the money allocated to them by the commissioning trusts. Because hospitals tend to provide more complex and specialised care, they receive the lion's share of NHS funding.

The hospital trusts own assets (such as hospitals and the equipment in them) purchased for the nation and held in trust for them. Some hospitals and trusts are affiliated with universities, like the Queen Alexandra Hospital in Portsmouth, affiliated with the University of Portsmouth. University hospitals are speciality trusts with involvement in research and education. Commissioning has also been extended to the very lowest level enabling GPs who identify a need in their community to commission services to meet that need. Primary care is delivered by a wide range of independent contractors such as GPs, dentists, pharmacists and optometrists and is the first point of contact for most people. Secondary care (sometimes termed acute health care) can be either elective care or emergency care and providers may be in the public or private sector, but the majority of secondary care happens in NHS owned facilities.

The Care Quality Commission is an executive non-departmental public body of the Department of Health and Social Care. It was established in 2009 to regulate and inspect health and social care services in England. The CQC's stated role is to make sure that hospitals, care homes, dental and general practices and other care services in England provide people with safe, effective and high-quality care, and to encourage those providers to improve. It carries out this role through checks during the registration process which all new care services must complete, as well as through inspections and monitoring of a range of data sources that can indicate problems with services.

The Department of Health and Social Care (DHSC) is the government department responsible for government policy on health and adult social care matters in England. The department develops policies and guidelines to improve the quality of care and to meet patient expectations. It carries out some of its work through arm's-length bodies (ALBs), including executive non-departmental public bodies such as NHS England, and executive agencies such as the Office for Health Improvement and Disparities (OHID), the UK Health Security Agency and the Medicines and Healthcare products Regulatory Agency (MHRA). Health Education England is responsible for ensuring enough high-quality training is available to develop the healthcare workforce.

The NHS also conducts research through the National Institute for Health and Care Research (NIHR). The National Institute for Health and Care Excellence (NICE) is an executive body of the Department of Health and Social Care in England that publishes guidelines in the use of health technologies, the use of new and existing medicines, treatments and procedures, clinical practice (guidance on the appropriate treatment and care of people with specific diseases and conditions), guidance for public sector workers on health promotion, and ill-health avoidance guidance for social care services. These appraisals are based primarily on evidence-based evaluations of efficacy, safety and cost-effectiveness in various circumstance.

The NHS is the world's largest health service and the world's fourth-largest employer.

=== NHS Constitution ===
The NHS Constitution for England establishes the principles and values of the NHS in England. It sets out rights to which patients, public and staff are entitled, and pledges which the NHS is committed to achieve, together with responsibilities, which the public, patients and staff owe to one another to ensure that the NHS operates fairly and effectively. The Secretary of State for Health and Social Care, all NHS bodies, private and voluntary sector providers supplying NHS services, and local authorities in the exercise of their public health functions are required by law to take account of the constitution in their decisions and actions.

The NHS is founded on a common set of principles and values that bind together the communities and people it serves – patients and public – and the staff who work for it. Seven key principles guide the NHS.

- The NHS provides a comprehensive service, available to all
- Access to NHS services is based on clinical need, not an individual's ability to pay
- The NHS aspires to the highest standards of excellence and professionalism
- The patient will be at the heart of everything the NHS does
- The NHS works across organisational boundaries
- The NHS is committed to providing best value for taxpayers’ money
- The NHS is accountable to the public, communities and patients that it serves

=== Patient experience ===
A patient needing specialist care at a hospital or clinic will be informed by the GP of the hospitals where they can get their treatment. This choice usually includes public and private hospitals. The NHS will pay for treatment in a private setting if the hospital meets the cost and service criteria that NHS hospitals adhere to; otherwise, opting for a private hospital makes the patient liable for private hospital fees. Because the private sector often has higher costs, most people choose to be treated for free in an NHS hospital. If the GP judges the case to be extremely urgent, the doctor may bypass the normal booking system and arrange an emergency admission.

Patients can be seen by the hospital as out-patients or in-patients, with the latter involving an overnight stay. The speed of in-patient admission is based on medical need and time spent waiting, with more urgent handled more quickly.

In 2008, trusts were working towards an 18-week guarantee: the hospital aimed to complete all tests and start treatment within 18 weeks of the date of the referral from the GP.

Almost all NHS hospital treatment is free of charge along with medicines administered in hospital, surgical consumables and appliances issued or loaned. However, if a patient has chosen to be treated in an NHS hospital as a private fee-paying patient by arrangement with his consultant, the patient (or the insurance company) will be billed. This can happen because at the inception of the NHS, hospital consultants were allowed to continue doing private work in NHS hospitals and can enable private patients to "jump the NHS queue". This arrangement is nowadays uncommon as most consultants and patients choose to have private work done in private hospitals.

Emergency Department (traditionally known as Accident and Emergency) treatment is also free of charge. A triage nurse prioritises all patients on arrival. Waiting times can be up to four hours if a patient goes to the Emergency Department with a minor problem, or they may be referred to other agencies (e.g. pharmacy, GP, Walk in clinic). Emergency Departments try to treat patients within four hours as part of NHS targets for emergency care. The Emergency Department is always attached to an NHS general hospital. Private hospitals do not provide emergency care services.

The NHS also provides end-of-life palliative care in the form of Palliative Care Specialist Nurses. The NHS can also commission the expertise of organisations in the voluntary sector to provide palliative care. Such organisations include Marie Curie Cancer Care, Sue Ryder Care and Macmillan Cancer Support. Despite their names, these services are designed for all palliative conditions, not exclusively cancer. All palliative care services provide support for both the patient and their relatives during and after the dying process, free of charge to the patient.

=== Experiences, perceptions and reporting of the NHS ===
Although the NHS has a high level of popular public support within the country, the national press is often highly critical of it and this may have affected perceptions of the service within the country as a whole and outside. An independent survey conducted in 2004 found that users of the NHS often expressed very high levels of satisfaction about their personal experience of the medical services they received. Of hospital inpatients, 92% said they were satisfied with their treatment; 87% of GP users were satisfied with their GP, 87% of hospital outpatients were satisfied with the service they received, and 70% of Accident and Emergency department users reported being satisfied.

When asked whether they agreed with the question "My local NHS is providing me with a good service" 67% of those surveyed agreed with it, and 51% agreed with the statement "The NHS is providing a good service''. The reason for this disparity between personal experience and overall perceptions is clear. The wait times for speciality service are rising. The survey also showed that net satisfaction with NHS services (the number reporting satisfied less those reporting dissatisfied) was generally higher amongst NHS services users than for all respondents (users as well as non-users). Where more people had no recent experience of that service, the difference in net positive perception reported by users compared to non-users was more likely to diverge.

For example, the least used service surveyed was walk-in centres (15% of all persons surveyed had used an NHS walk-in clinic in the last year) but 85% of walk-in clinic users were satisfied with the service they received. Users' net positive satisfaction was 80%. However, for all respondents (including non-recent users) the overall net positive satisfaction was 25%. The service with the highest rate of use was the GP service (77% having seen their GP in the last year) and the difference in net satisfaction between users and all users was the smallest (76% and 74% net satisfied respectively).

It is also apparent from the survey that most people realise that the national press is generally critical of the service (64% reporting it as being critical compared to just 13% saying the national press is favourable), and also that the national press is the least reliable source of information (50% reporting it to be not very or not at all reliable, compared to 36% believing the press was reliable). Newspapers were reported as being less favourable and also less reliable than the broadcast media. The most reliable sources of information were considered to be leaflets from GPs and information from friends (both 77% reported as reliable) and medical professionals (75% considered reliable).

In 2009, most people thought that the NHS was well run, with 73% of people reporting that they were satisfied with the running of the service and only a little over 10% reporting themselves as dissatisfied. In February 2020, there were 4.7 million cases on waiting lists for consultant-led care. In April 2024, following the effects of COVID-19, this number had increased to nearly 7.6 million, involving 6.3 million people. By May 2026 the number of people on the list had fallen by 450,000 since July 2024, and roughly 65% of patients were being treated or seen within the 18-week standard.

== Royal colleges ==
Medical royal colleges are professional bodies in the form of a royal college responsible for the development of and training in one or more medical specialities. They are generally charged with setting standards within their field and for supervising the training of doctors within that speciality, although the responsibility for the application of those standards. Most medical royal colleges are members of the Academy of Medical Royal Colleges (AoMRC).

The royal colleges are involved with international activities to improve health through education and training. The Royal College of General Practitioners has been actively involved on an international level to help family medicine doctors have access to "contextually relevant training and development programmes". Medical colleges can seek royal patronage and permission to use the prefix royal, usually also having a royal charter.

Professional bodies in England include:

- Royal College of Anaesthetists
- Royal College of Emergency Medicine
- Royal College of General Practitioners
- Royal College of Nursing
- Royal College of Obstetricians and Gynaecologists
- Royal College of Ophthalmologists
- Royal College of Paediatrics and Child Health
- Royal College of Pathologists
- Royal College of Physicians
- Royal College of Podiatry
- Royal College of Psychiatrists
- Royal College of Radiologists
- Royal College of Surgeons of England
- Royal College of Veterinary Surgeons

== Medical associations ==
The British Medical Association (BMA) is a registered trade union for doctors in England. The BMA has a range of representative and scientific committees and is recognised by National Health Service employers as the sole contract negotiator for doctors. The BMA's stated aim is "to promote the medical and allied sciences, and to maintain the honour and interests of the medical profession".

The Royal Society of Medicine (RSM) is one of the major providers of accredited postgraduate medical education in England. Each year, the RSM organises over 400 academic and public events. The RSM is home to one of the largest medical libraries in Europe, with an extensive collection of journal and online medical databases. As well as providing medical education, the Society aims to promote an exchange of information and ideas on the science, practice and organisation of medicine, both within the health professions and with responsible and informed public opinion.

The Royal College of Physicians (RCP) is a professional membership body dedicated to improving the practice of medicine, chiefly through the accreditation of physicians by examination. Founded by royal charter from King Henry VIII in 1518, the RCP is the oldest medical college in England. It set the first international standard in the classification of diseases, and its library contains medical texts of great historical interest. There are many medical associations and national specialist societies in England, promoting knowledge, science, and healthcare research.

== Medical schools ==
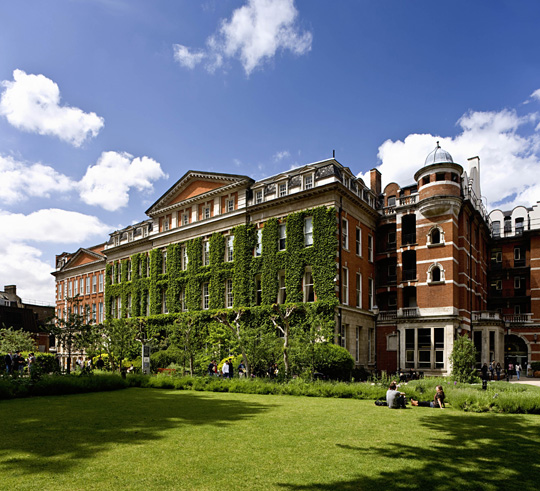
GKT School of Medical Education is the medical school of King's College London.

Medical schools generally refer to departments within a universities which are involved in the education of future medical practitioners. All leading medical schools in England are state-funded and their core purpose is to train doctors on behalf of the National Health Service. In England students generally begin medical school after secondary education. Medical schools can also carry out medical research and operate teaching hospitals.

There are thirty four medical schools in the United Kingdom that are recognised by the General Medical Council and where students can study for a medical degree. Applications for entry into medical school (in common with other university courses) are made through the Universities and Colleges Admissions Service (UCAS). Such medical degrees include the Bachelor of Medicine, Bachelor of Surgery (MBBS, MBChB, MBBCh, BMBS). Most medical schools in England also require applicants to sit additional entrance tests such as the Universities Clinical Aptitude Test (UCAT) (required by 26 universities) and the BioMedical Admissions Test (BMAT) (required by 5 universities). The number of available medical school places had risen by 3,500 since 1998.

Examples of medical schools include Barts and The London School of Medicine and Dentistry, Brunel Medical School, UCLan School of Medicine, University of Exeter Medical School, Edge Hill University Faculty of Health, Social Care & Medicine, Plymouth University Peninsula Schools of Medicine and Dentistry, Imperial College School of Medicine, Sheffield Medical School and King's College London School of Medicine and Dentistry.

== Private provision ==
England has a small private health care sector. Private health care is sometimes funded by employers through medical insurance as part of a benefits package to employees though it is mostly the larger companies that do. Insurers also market policies directly to the public. Most private care is for specialist referrals with most people retaining their NHS GP as point of first contact.

The private sector does some subcontracting work for the NHS. Thus an NHS patient can be treated in the private sector as an NHS patient if the health services has subcontracted work to the hospital. Some private hospitals are business enterprises and some are non-profit-making trusts. Some hospital groups provide insurance plans (e.g. Bupa, Benenden), and some insurance companies have deals with particular private hospital groups. Some private sector patients can be treated in NHS hospitals in which case the patient or his/her insurance company is billed.

The Care Quality Commission, after inspecting more than 200 private sector hospitals, warned in April 2018 that informality in processes meant that systematic and robust safety procedures were not in place. Hospital consultants are generally not employed by the private hospitals where they have admitting rights and the commission said private companies could be reluctant to challenge them. Safety was viewed as the responsibility of individual clinicians, rather than a corporate responsibility supported by formal governance processes. Furthermore, private hospitals "were not set up to anticipate and handle emergency situations". There were only 15 critical care services across 206 hospital sites so in an emergency they had to rely on the 999 service.

== See also ==
- History of the National Health Service
- List of NHS trusts in England
- List of hospitals in England
- NHS app
