= Richard Vautrey =

British doctor

Richard Mark Vautrey CBE FRCGP is a doctor who was President of the Royal College of General Practitioners 2023–2025, having formerly been Chair of the British Medical Association's (BMA) General Practitioners Committee 2017–2021. He was a nationally elected member of the BMA Council. He works as a general practitioner (GP) in Leeds and he was an assistant medical secretary of Leeds Local Medical Committee.

== Background ==
In his eighth year as deputy chair of the General Practitioners Committee he was described by Pulse as "the smartest hard working GP politician who puts everyone else in the shade" and the fourth most influential GP.

He has been Leeds Local Medical Committee secretary and now assistant secretary for 14 years and has been involved in negotiations over the GP contract.

Vautrey was regularly quoted as a spokesperson for General Practitioners. In April 2015 he said the fact that 16% of GPs report 'unmanageable stress' is truly startling. He condemned Basildon and Brentwood CCG's decision to limit GP referrals for vasectomy. In March 2015, he defended the 2004 GP contract.

On 20 July 2017, he was elected as the Chair of the British Medical Association's General Practitioners Committee of England and took up the position immediately. He resigned on 1 November 2021.

In September 2023, it was announced that he had been elected President of the Royal College of General Practitioners and would take up the role the following month for a two-year period.
