= Local medical committee =

A local medical committee is a statutory body in the UK. LMCs are recognised by successive NHS Acts as the professional organisation representing individual GPs and GP practices as a whole to the primary care organisation. The NHS Act 1999 extended the LMC role to include representation of all GPs whatever their contractual status. This includes sessional GP and GP speciality registrars. The LMC represents the views of GPs to any other appropriate organisation or agency.

In the United Kingdom, local medical committees (LMCs) have been the local general practitioner (GP) committees since 1911. They represent all general practitioners in their geographical area which is historically coterminous with the successive Primary Care Organisations or other healthcare administrative areas.

As the organisation and complexity of primary care has increased and along with the call for increased professionalism and specialisation of for instance negotiators, LMCs' administrative structures have developed from a pile of papers on the kitchen table of the LMC medical secretary to permanent staff and offices with substantial assets. This has allowed the LMCs to develop relationships ranging over time, topic and space between mutual suspicion and antagonism to useful cooperation for common benefit with NHS administrative organisations.

The LMCs interact and work with and through the British Medical Association's General Practitioners Committee (GPC) and with other craft committees and local specialist medical committees in various ways, including conferences. The Northumberland Local Medical Committee has been involved in "creating a general practice data set in England."

They are funded by a statutory levy, of so many pence per patient on GP principals and practices, and generally receive contributions from non-principal GPs on various local bases.

They have recently rejected the opt-out model for care records in Great Britain, were involved in a nurse controversy, and became "divided over what the GPC's action should be on pay freeze in Great Britain."
