= History of the National Health Service (England) =

Leaflet concerning the launch of the NHS in England and Wales.

The National Health Service in England was created by the National Health Service Act 1946. Responsibility for the NHS in Wales was passed to the Secretary of State for Wales in 1969, leaving the Secretary of State for Social Services responsible for the NHS in England by itself.

== Development of the NHS in England and Wales, 1948–1969 ==
The original structure of the NHS in England and Wales had three aspects, known as the tripartite system:

- Hospital services: Fourteen regional hospital boards were created in England and Wales to administer most hospital services. Beneath these were 400 hospital management committees which administered hospitals. Teaching hospitals had different arrangements and were organised under boards of governors.
- Primary care: GPs were independent contractors (that is, they were not salaried employees) and would be paid for each person on their list. Dentists, opticians and pharmacists also generally provided services as independent contractors. Executive councils were formed and administered contracts and payments to the contractor professions as well as maintaining lists of local practitioners and dealing with patients.
- Community services: Maternity and child welfare clinics, health visitors, midwives, health education, vaccination & immunisation and ambulance services together with environmental health services were the responsibility of local authorities. This was a continuation of the role local government had held under the Poor Laws.

In 1948 across England and Wales there were 377 hospital management committees, and 36 teaching hospitals, each with its own board of governors. There were also 146 local health authorities, running health centres, ambulances services and other community services, and 140 executive councils, managing general practices, NHS dentistry, pharmacists and opticians. The new service instantly became Britain's third largest employer with around 364,000 staff across England and Wales. These included 9,000 full-time doctors, 19,000 professional and technical staff (including 2,800 physiotherapists, 1,600 laboratory technicians and 2,000 radiographers), 25,000 administrative and clerical staff, 149,000 nurses and midwives (23,000 of whom were part-time), and 128,000 ancillary staff (catering, laundry, cleaning and maintenance).

By the beginning of the 1950s, spending on the NHS was exceeding expectations, leading in 1952 to the introduction of a one-shilling charge for prescriptions and a £1 charge for dental treatment; these were exceptions to the NHS being free at the point of use.

=== Guillebaud Report ===
Political concerns about spiralling NHS costs later receded in the wake of the 1956 Guillebaud Report, which praised the "responsible attitude among hospital authorities" towards the "efficient and economical" use of public funds.

Guillebaud Reported that, during the first three years of the service, the cost of pharmaceutical services in England and Wales rose from £33.2 million to £44.1 million. This significantly exceeded the estimate made by the Select Committee on Estimates, which had projected an expenditure of £11.45 million for the first nine months, compared with an actual outlay of £15.893 million. In 1952, a study of the social aspects of prescribing was initiated by Richard Titmuss, Brian Abel-Smith, and colleagues at the Social Research Division of the London School of Economics. The project was later published as Social Aspects of Prescribing (1957), one of the first systematic investigations of NHS drug costs using a large state dataset and advanced statistical methods. It highlighted the importance of administrative mechanisms for the “control” of prescribing, laying a foundation for subsequent analyses of pharmaceutical expenditure and continued efforts for controlling prescribing costs in the NHS.

== 1950s and 1960s ==
The 1950s saw the planning of hospital services, dealing in part with some of the gaps and duplications that existed across England and Wales. The period also saw growth in the number of medical staff and a more even distribution of them with the development of hospital outpatient services. By 1956, the NHS was stretched financially and doctors were disaffected, resulting in a Royal Commission on doctors' pay being set up in February 1957. The investigation and trial of alleged serial killer John Bodkin Adams exposed some of the tensions in the system. Indeed, if he had been found guilty (for, in the eyes of doctors, accidentally killing a patient while providing treatment) and hanged, the whole NHS might have collapsed. The Mental Health Act 1959 also significantly altered legislation in respect of mental illness and reduced the grounds on which someone could be detained in a mental hospital.

The 1960s have been characterised as a period of growth. Prescription charges were abolished in 1965 and reintroduced in 1968. New drugs came to the market improving healthcare, including polio vaccine, dialysis for chronic kidney failure and chemotherapy for certain cancers were developed, all adding to upfront costs. Health Secretary Enoch Powell undertook three initiatives:

- The Hospital Plan published in 1962 proposed the development of district general hospitals for population areas of about 125,000 and laid out a pattern for the future district by district;
- The Church House speech predicted that many of the large mental health institutions would close within ten years.

Concern continued to grow about the structure of the NHS and weaknesses of the tripartite system. Powell agreed to the creation of a Royal Commission on doctors' pay, which resulted in a statutory review body. Further development came in the form of the Charter of General Practice, negotiated between new Health Minister Kenneth Robinson and the BMA, that provided financial incentives for practice development. This resulted in the concept of the primary health care in better-housed and better-staffed practices, stimulating doctors to join together and the development of the modern group practice.

In 1969, responsibility for the NHS in Wales was passed to the Secretary of State for Wales from the Secretary of State for Health who was thereafter just responsible for the NHS in England.

After the publication by the British Medical Journal on 24 December 1949 of University of Cambridge consultant paediatrician Douglas Gairdner's landmark paper detailing the lack of medical benefit and the risks attached to non-therapeutic (routine) circumcision, the National Health Service took a decision that circumcision would not be performed unless there was a clear and present medical indication. Both the cost and the non-therapeutic, unnecessary, harmful nature of the surgical operation were taken into account.

== 1970s and early 1980s ==
The NHS in England was reorganised in 1974 to bring together services provided by hospitals and services provided by local authorities under the umbrella of regional health authorities, with a further restructuring in 1982. The 1970s also saw the end of the economic optimism which had characterised the 1960s and increasing pressures coming to bear to reduce the amount of money spent on public services and to ensure increased efficiency for the money spent.

The 1970s and 1980s saw issues with contaminated blood and blood products which was referred to later as the "worst treatment disaster in the history of the NHS".

== Thatcher government reforms ==
In the 1980s, Thatcherism represented a systematic, decisive rejection and reversal of the post-war consensus, whereby the major political parties largely agreed on the central themes of Keynesianism, the welfare state, nationalised industry, public housing and close regulation of the economy. There was one major exception: the National Health Service, which was widely popular and had wide support inside the Conservative Party. Prime Minister Margaret Thatcher promised Britons in 1982, the NHS is "safe in our hands."

In the 1980s modern management processes (General Management) were introduced in the NHS to replace the previous system of consensus management. This was outlined in the Griffiths Report of 1983. This recommended the appointment of general managers in the NHS with whom responsibility should lie. The report also recommended that clinicians be better involved in management. Financial pressures continued to place strain on the NHS. In 1987, an additional £101 million was provided by the government to the NHS. In 1988 the then Prime Minister, Margaret Thatcher, announced a review of the NHS. From this review and in 1989, two white papers, Working for Patients and Caring for People, were produced. These outlined the introduction of what was termed the "internal market", which was to shape the structure and organisation of health services for most of the next decade. In spite of intensive opposition from the BMA, who wanted a pilot study or the reforms in one region, the internal market was introduced.

The National Health Service and Community Care Act 1990 (in England) defined this "internal market", whereby health authorities ceased to run hospitals but "purchased" care from their own or other authorities' hospitals. Certain GPs became "fund holders" and were able to purchase care for their patients. The "providers" became NHS trusts, which encouraged competition but also increased local differences.

Studies suggest that while the competition introduced in the "internal market" system resulted in shorter waiting times it also caused a reduction in the quality of care for patients.

== Blair government reforms ==
These innovations, especially the "fund holder" option, were condemned at the time by the Labour Party. Opposition to what was claimed to be a Conservative intention to privatise the NHS became a major feature of Labour's election campaigns.

Labour came to power in 1997 with the promise to remove the "internal market" and abolish fundholding. In a speech given by the new Prime Minister, Tony Blair, at the Lonsdale Medical Centre on 9 December 1997, he stated that:

The White Paper we are publishing today marks a turning point for the NHS. It replaces the internal market with "integrated care". We will put doctors and nurses in the driving seat. The result will be that £1 billion of unnecessary red tape will be saved and the money put into frontline patient care. For the first time the need to ensure that high quality care is spread throughout the service will be taken seriously. National standards of care will be guaranteed. There will be easier and swifter access to the NHS when you need it. Our approach combines efficiency and quality with a belief in fairness and partnership. Comparing not competing will drive efficiency.

— Tony Blair, 9 December 1997

However, in his second term Blair pursued measures to strengthen the internal market as part of his plan to "modernise" the NHS.

Driving these reforms were a number of factors including the rising costs of medical technology and medicines, the desire to increase standards and "patient choice", an ageing population, and a desire to contain government expenditure. Since the national health services in Wales, Scotland and Northern Ireland are not controlled by the UK government, these reforms have increased the differences between the national health services in different parts of the United Kingdom. (See NHS Wales and NHS Scotland for descriptions of their developments).

Reforms included (amongst other actions) the laying down of detailed service standards, strict financial budgeting, revised job specifications, reintroduction of a modified form of fundholding – "practice-based commissioning", closure of surplus facilities and emphasis on rigorous clinical and corporate governance. In addition Modernising Medical Careers medical training had an unsuccessful restructuring which was so badly managed that the Secretary of State for Health was forced to apologise publicly. It was then revised but its flawed implementation left the NHS with significant medical staffing problems. Some new services were developed to help manage demand, including NHS Direct. A new emphasis was given to staff reforms, with the Agenda for Change agreement providing harmonised pay and career progression. These changes gave rise to controversy within the medical professions, the media and the public.

The Blair Government, whilst leaving services free at point of use, encouraged outsourcing of medical services and support to the private sector. Under the Private Finance Initiative, an increasing number of hospitals were built (or rebuilt) by private sector consortia; hospitals may have both medical services (such as independent sector treatment centre (ISTC or "surgicentres"), and non-medical services (such as catering) provided under long-term contracts by the private sector. A study by a consultancy company which worked for the Department of Health showed that every £200 million spent on privately financed hospitals resulted in the loss of 1000 doctors and nurses. The first PFI hospitals contained some 28 per cent fewer beds than the ones they replaced.

In 2005, surgicentres treated around three per cent of NHS patients (in England) having routine surgery. By 2008 this was expected to be around 10 per cent. Primary care trusts were given the target of sourcing at least 15 per cent of primary care from the private or voluntary sectors over the medium term.

As a corollary to these initiatives, the NHS was required to take on pro-active socially "directive" policies, for example, in respect of smoking and obesity.

The NHS encountered significant problems with the information technology (IT) innovations accompanying the Blair reforms. The NHS's National Programme for IT (NPfIT), believed to be the largest IT project in the world, is running significantly behind schedule and above budget, with friction between the government and the programme contractors. Originally budgeted at £2.3 billion, present estimates are £20–30 billion and rising. There has also been criticism of a lack of patient information security. The ability to deliver integrated high quality services will require care professionals to use sensitive medical data. This must be controlled and in the NPfIT model it is, sometimes too tightly to allow the best care to be delivered. One concern is that GPs and hospital doctors have given the project a lukewarm reception, citing a lack of consultation and complexity. Key "front-end" parts of the programme include Choose and Book, intended to assist patient choice of location for treatment, which has missed numerous deadlines for going "live", substantially overrun its original budget, and is still (May 2006) available in only a few locations. The programme to computerise all NHS patient records is also experiencing great difficulties. Furthermore, there are unresolved financial and managerial issues on training NHS staff to introduce and maintain these systems once they are operative.

Between 2004/5 and 2013/4 NHS output increased considerably. Hospital admissions increased by 32%, outpatient attendances by 17%, primary care consultations by 25% and community care activity by 14%. Hospital death rates reduced, especially in stroke. At the same time there was an increase in wages of 24% and an increase of 10% in the number of staff and increases in the use of equipment and supplies. As a whole NHS output increased by 47% and inputs by 31%, an increase in productivity of 12.86% during the period, or 1.37% per year.

== Coalition and Cameron government reforms ==
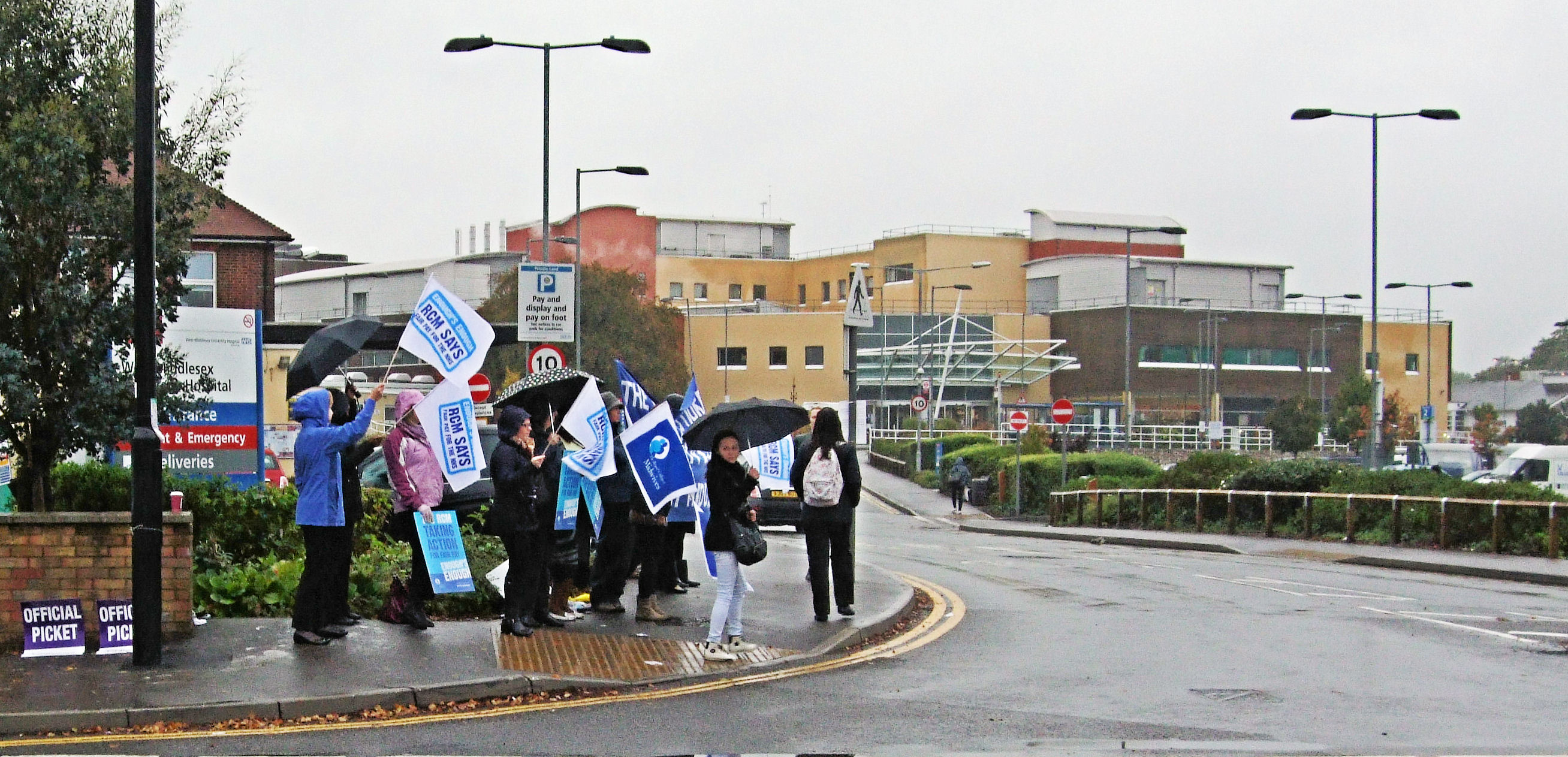
Royal College of Midwives Picketing the West Middlesex Hospital, Isleworth. Thousands of other NHS staff across England also staged a four-hour strike over pay on 13 October 2014.

The return of a Conservative-led government in 2010 coincided with another deterioration in industrial relations. The introduction of further private sector involvement in the Health and Social Care Act 2012 provoked mass demonstrations led by health workers, and some NHS workers also participated in a national strike over pay restraint in 2014. 2016 also saw major industrial action by junior doctors, protesting at the imposition of a new contract aiming to extend weekend working. The Health and Social Care Act 2012 did not extend patient choice as envisaged (as this policy subsequently took a backseat) but did lead to an increasing amount of the NHS budget being diverted to private providers.

In 2019, doctors and MPs warned that the ongoing privatisation of certain NHS England cancer screening services would lead to patient harm.

In July 2019, it was announced that the NHS would be partnering with the virtual assistant Amazon Alexa to offer health advice directly from the NHS website.

== Starmer government reforms ==
In March 2025, Prime Minister Keir Starmer announced that the body that oversees National Health Service operations in England (NHS England) would be abolished in order to release bureaucratic pressures on the NHS and free up funding for more effective use within the service.

== Campaigns ==
The NHS has held regular health campaigns both for public/patient health awareness and as part of staff development. Scale ranges from UK-wide to hospital-ward-based. Some campaigns have been led by the NHS, others they have been an official partner in. Campaigns have included:

- Sign up to Safety (2014-2017) – National campaign to ensure staff coordinate their efforts and ideas around ensuring and enhancing safety.
- NHS Change Day (2013-2016) – Annual 1-day campaign to get staff contributing ideas to improve the NHS.
- Antibiotic Guardian (2014-present as at 2025) – Gathers pledges to slow antibiotic resistance. European Antibiotic Awareness Day (EAAD) is held on 18 November.

== See also ==
- History of the National Health Service
- History of NHS Scotland
- History of NHS Wales
- History of Health and Social Care in Northern Ireland
- Keep Our NHS Public
- List of hospitals in England
- List of NHS trusts
