= Working in Partnership Programme =

Working in Partnership Programme (WiPP) was launched in England in 2004 under the new general medical services (nGMS) contract to support doctors in general practice by providing them with innovative ideas on how to improve services for the public.

== Initiatives ==
The GMS contract provided the funds, while the initiatives are being implemented by a number of different agencies including primary care trusts as well as non-government organisations in England. The WiPP website provides several resources for this program. The programme has several initiatives.

1. Self Care Support for people and professionals
2. Self Care Support in Schools—Making Sense of Health project
3. Database of Good Practice—identifies, reviews and signposts existing good examples in general practice in England
4. Sickness Absence Management
5. Workload Analysis Tool to help analyse workload data in general practices and other primary care organisations
6. Improving the Management of Repeat Medicines in Primary Care
7. Minor Illness Management
8. Primary Care Management Development Programme resources
9. General Practice Nursing—Getting it Right for Patients and Public Health
10. Health Care Assistants—facilitating their employment, training, development and integration
11. Vocational Training Scheme for General Practice managers
12. National Primary Care Mental Health Collaborative
