= Locum =

Person who temporarily fulfills the duties of another

A locum, or locum tenens, is a person who temporarily fulfills the duties of another; the term is especially used for physicians or clergy. For example, a locum tenens physician is a physician who works in the place of the regular physician. In the Catholic Church, an example of a locum tenens is an apostolic administrator, often a bishop who temporarily governs a vacant see until a new ordinary is appointed.

Locum tenens is a Latin phrase meaning "place holding", akin to the Greek topoteretes, or French lieutenant.

== United Kingdom healthcare ==
In the United Kingdom, the NHS on average has 3,500 locum doctors working in hospitals on any given day, with another 17,000 locum general practitioners (GPs).

On the other hand, GP locums (freelance GPs) mostly work independently from locum agencies, either as self-employed or via freelance GP chambers based on the NASGP's Sessional GP Support Team (SGPST) model. Some GPs have been employed by the primary care trusts (PCTs) to provide locum cover. However, PCTs were abolished in 2013 and replaced by the clinical commissioning groups (CCGs).

== Advantages and disadvantages ==
Locums provide a ready means for organizations to fill positions that are temporarily vacant or for which no long-term funding is available. Working as a locum allows a professional to gain experience in a variety of work environments or specialties.

Some locum recruitment agencies offer pre-employment training to foreign medical graduates before their first professional experience in the primary care system.

However, reliance on locums has some disadvantages:

- The transient nature of the assignment means extra stress and work for locums whenever they assume a new position.
- For the hiring organisation, that generally means that the required flexibility and lack of guaranteed income must be rewarded with higher compensation.
- In professions that require knowledge of patient histories, locums may provide work of lower quality or be perceived as doing so. They may also be resented by permanent staff because they are paid more or considered to shoulder less responsibility.
