= Sessional GP =

A sessional GP is an umbrella term for general practitioners (GPs) whose work is organised on a sessional basis, as opposed to GP partners (also called GP principals) whose contract is generally for 24-hour care. The term was first coined by the National Association of Sessional GPs (NASGP), who at the time were called the National Association of Non-Principals (NANP). After consultation with their membership, it was perceived that the term 'non-principal' (which referred to any GP who wasn't a GP principal or partner) was a term that defined these GPs using a negative definition rather than a positive one.

A sessional GP therefore is any GP working as a locum GP or as a salaried GP, and also includes GPs on the returner scheme, and GP retainees.

A locum, is a fully qualified general practitioner who does not have a standard employment contract with the primary care health centre where they work. They are paid by the session, as a difference to the other two types of contractual relationship in a GP practice, salaried GPs and GP partners.

Locum GPs are often self-employed professionals, therefore not entitled to sick leave, holiday pay or redundancy compensation. They obtain work by contracting their services directly with health centres or through temporary staff recruitment agencies. Recent changes in the regulations in United Kingdom allow them to form Limited Liability Companies, although by doing so forfeit the right to contribute income through that company to the NHS superannuation scheme.

Locum GPs typically cover permanent doctors when on sick leave, maternity leave or holiday and fill the gaps between the moment a doctor leaves a practice and another permanent doctor is recruited. They also may be hired to increase the workforce during periods of high demand. Although locum GPs are usually contracted to cover temporary needs, it is not uncommon to find locum GPs working in health centres for long periods of time, sometimes even years.

A typical session in the United Kingdom is equivalent to 4 hours and 10 minutes of work, and frequently involves 3 hours of face to face contact with patients in 10 minutes appointments, followed by time for administration (reviewing correspondence from the hospital, reviewing blood test results, writing referral letters, triaging patients' calls…) and doing home visits.

In order to practice as a sessional GP, the doctor must be a fully qualified GP and must prove that they maintain and update their skills and knowledge to the same standard as any other GP.

Some GPs choose to practice as sessional doctors to allow them to meet other personal commitments, for example, mothers with small children, while for others it is a lifestyle choice.

There are an estimated 22,500 doctors in the UK working as sessional GPs. In 2011 a report suggested the demand for such physicians is expected to increase as National Health Service reforms come into effect.

In 2002, the NASGP developed the locum chambers concept, also referred to as a 'virtual practice', within which locum GPs work together as a collaborative team to support each other, rather than as conventional locum GPs who effectively compete with each other. Resources are all pooled, enabling the chambers to employ staff to support appraisal activities, educational events and organising work. The first chambers to become established was Pallant Medical Chambers in 2004, followed by Yorkshire Medical Chambers in 2008.

== Representative organisations ==
- National Association of Sessional GPs
- Sessional GP Subcommittee of the General Practitioners Committee of the British Medical Association

== Advantages ==
Sessional GPs tend to have more flexibility in their working conditions: hours, days, type of work. Sessional GPs potentially reduce the bureaucratic burden posed by permanent GPs.

== Disadvantages ==
- Pay and distance to work may vary significantly due to market conditions.

- The need to adjust to different computer systems, local protocols and referral pathways.

- Lack of control on the organization of the workplace.

- Difficulties related to participating only on a snapshot of the care of patients with long term medical conditions.

- Professional isolation

== Royal Medical Benevolent Fund ==
In July 2010, the Royal Medical Benevolent Fund (RMBF) published its report on sessional GPs entitled Support for Sessional GPs, highlighting the professional isolation of these general practitioners, and recommending the urgent need for professional support such a freelance GP chambers, and highlighting the benefits that meeting up regularly can bring, such as being part of a Self-Directed Learning Group (SDLG).

In March 2011, the RMBF convened a high-level meeting in London with representatives from the British Medical Association, Royal College of General Practitioners (RCGP), Departments of Health from all four UK countries, and other GP representative organisations. As the outcome of that meeting, the RCGP agreed to take on the baton from the RMBF to reduce sessional GP isolation.
