= History of NHS Scotland =

NHS Scotland is the publicly funded healthcare systems in Scotland. It was founded by the National Health Service (Scotland) Act 1947 (since repealed by the National Health Service (Scotland) Act 1978) and was launched on 5 July 1948, under the control of the Secretary of State for Scotland. As a result of the Scotland Act 1998, control over NHS Scotland transferred to the Scottish Government and Parliament in 1999.

== Background ==
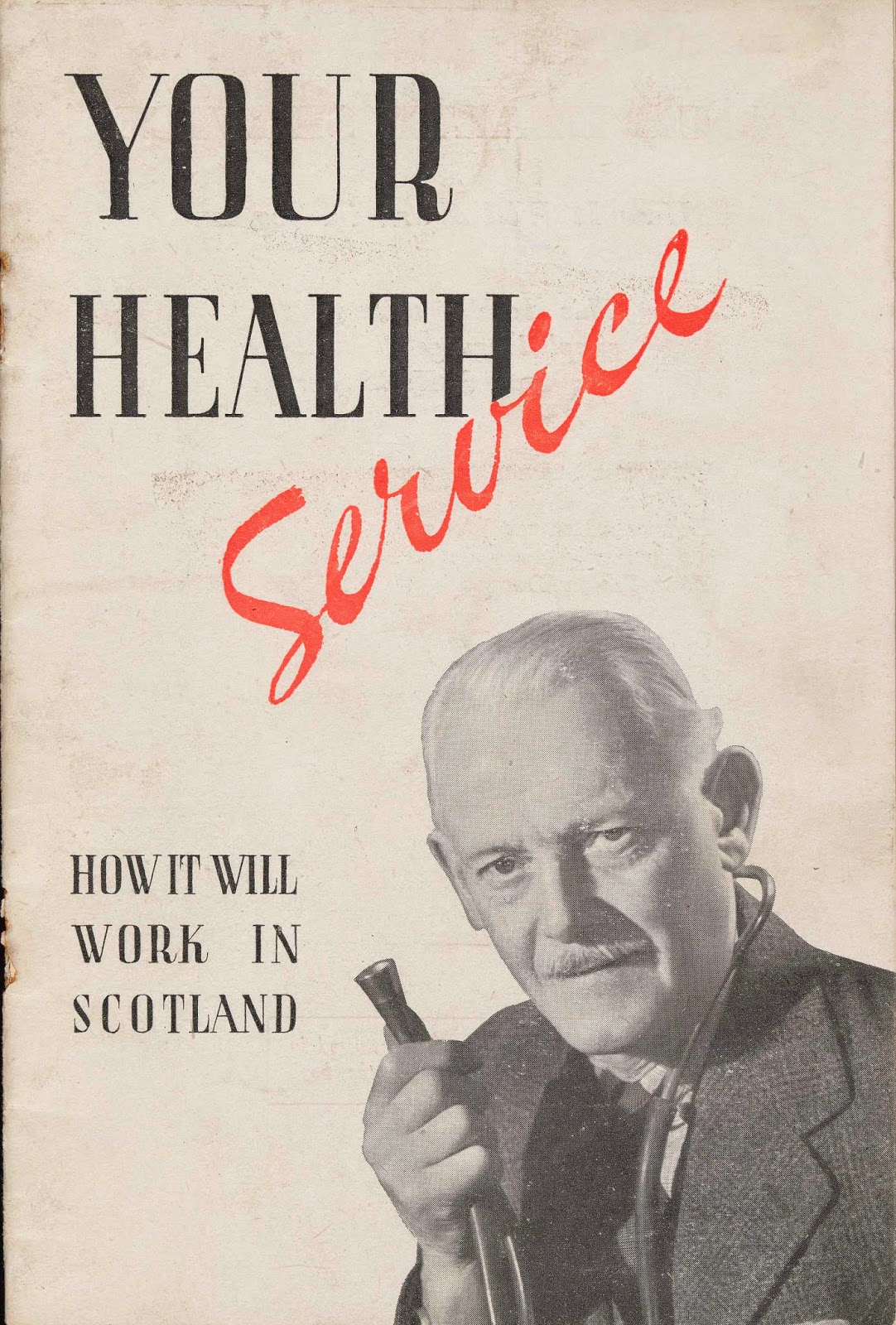
"Your Health Service: How it will work in Scotland", 1948

Prior to the creation of Scotland's NHS in 1947, the state was involved with the provision of healthcare, though it was not universal. Half of Scotland's landmass was already covered by the Highlands and Islands Medical Service, a state-funded health system run directly from Edinburgh, which had been set up 35 years earlier. In addition, there had been a substantial state-funded hospital building programme during the war years. Scotland also had its own distinctive medical tradition, centred on its medical schools rather than private practice, and a detailed plan for the future of health provision based on the Cathcart report.

Facilities were built during the Second World War that took hospital capacity to 30,000 beds.

By June 1947, there were 112 centres that were part of the St Andrews and Red Cross service.

The 1948 Act provided a uniform national structure for services which had previously been provided by a combination of the Highlands and Islands Medical Service, local government, charities and private organisations which in general was only free for emergency use. The new system was funded from central taxation and did not generally involve a charge at the time of use for services concerned with existing medical conditions or vaccinations carried out as a matter of general public health requirements.

The Scottish NHS was formed on 5 July 1948.

== Prescription charges ==
The NHS (Amendment) Act 1949 was passed by a Labour government and allowed a prescription charge to be collected, although these fees were first introduced by a Conservative government in 1952. However, prescription charges in Scotland were abolished by the Scottish Government on 1 April 2011, leaving England as the only country in the UK in which such charges still exist.

== Programmes ==
In 1962 a £70 million programme of hospital modernisation was announced.

== See also ==
- History of Health and Social Care in Northern Ireland
- History of NHS Wales
- History of the National Health Service (England)
