= Local insurance committee =

Historical UK health insurance bodies

Local insurance committees were statutory bodies created under the National Insurance Act 1911 to administer medical benefits for insured workers in the United Kingdom. The committees were responsible for overseeing access to panel doctors, the supply of prescribed medicines, and financial arrangements between doctors, pharmacists and the government.

== Background ==
The 1911 Act provided health insurance for workers earning under £160 per year, with contributions from individuals, employers and the government on a "ninepence for fourpence" basis. Insured workers received limited sick pay and access to a "panel doctor".

Before the scheme, many family doctors in industrial areas dispensed the drugs they prescribed directly to patients. Under the National Insurance Scheme (NIS), however, urban doctors increasingly wrote prescriptions that could be cashed at pharmacies on the local "pharmaceutical list". As a result, pharmacists supplied the majority of medicines in towns and cities, while doctors in rural areas often continued to self-dispense due to the absence of local pharmacies. The range of drugs available to rural patients was therefore often determined by the stock that dispensing doctors were willing or able to provide.

Under the NIS, doctors were paid by capitation for each insured patient, while pharmacists received a fee for each item dispensed. This arrangement created little incentive to limit the volume of prescribing: high-volume prescribers could attract more patients, and pharmacists benefited financially from dispensing more items. Rising expenditure soon became a concern for administrators, who were required to keep costs within government spending limits.

== Cost control measures ==
To improve prescribing and contain costs, the administrators introduced several measures. Copies of the National Formulary were distributed free to panel doctors, regional medical officers were instructed to visit high-cost prescribers, and in extreme cases the Minister of Health could reduce the remuneration of doctors judged to be excessive prescribers. These measures, however, often relied on professional goodwill and voluntary compliance.

=== The Floating Sixpence ===
One attempt at systematic cost control was the so-called Floating Sixpence. If per capita pharmaceutical expenditure in a local area fell below the average capitation payment of two shillings per insured person per year, up to sixpence per head could be added to local doctors’ remuneration. Conversely, if expenditure exceeded the benchmark, payments to local pharmacists were reduced in order to offset costs. Although designed to contain overall spending, the scheme proved unpopular and was abolished in 1920.

== Key events ==
- 1911 – National Insurance Act provided medical benefits for workers earning under £160 per year.
- 1913 – National Insurance Scheme formally introduced as the UK’s first health insurance scheme.
- 1913 – The Floating Sixpence scheme established to limit prescribing costs.
- 1920 – The Floating Sixpence scheme abolished.

== See also ==
- National Insurance Act 1911
- History of the National Health Service
- British National Formulary
