= National Health Service =

Publicly-funded healthcare systems in the United Kingdom

Logos of the National Health Service

Logo of the NHS in England (Note: Sometimes used as a UK-wide logo for unofficial purposes. The three other national health services in the UK outside England have their own logos and names.)

Logo of HSC in Northern Ireland

Logo of NHS Scotland

Logo of NHS Wales

National Health Service

- England: National Health Service (England)
- Northern Ireland: Health and Social Care
- Scotland: NHS Scotland
- Wales: NHS Wales

Integrated Care Boards of the National Health Service (England) Health and Social Care Trusts of Health and Social Care in Northern Ireland NHS Boards of NHS Scotland Local Health Boards of NHS Wales

The National Health Service (NHS) comprises the four separate publicly funded healthcare systems of the United Kingdom: the National Health Service in England, NHS Scotland, NHS Wales, and Health and Social Care in Northern Ireland, which were created separately, and are often referred to collectively or individually as "the NHS".

The three original systems for England and Wales, Scotland and Northern Ireland were established in 1948 – with a Welsh system later founded in 1969 – as part of major social reforms following the Second World War, and officially launched at Park Hospital in Davyhulme, near Manchester, England (now known as Trafford General Hospital). The founding principles were that services should be comprehensive, universal and free at the point of delivery. Each system provides a comprehensive range of health services, provided without charge for residents of the United Kingdom apart from dental treatment and optical care, though NHS patients in England who are not exempt have to pay prescription charges.

Taken together, the four systems in 2015–16 employed around 1.6 million people with a combined budget of £136.7 billion. In 2024, the total health sector workforce across the United Kingdom was 1,499,368. When purchasing consumables such as medications, the four healthcare systems have significant market power that influences the global price, typically keeping prices lower. A small number of products are procured jointly through contracts shared between systems. Several other countries directly rely on Britain's assessments for their own decisions on state-financed drug reimbursements.

== History ==
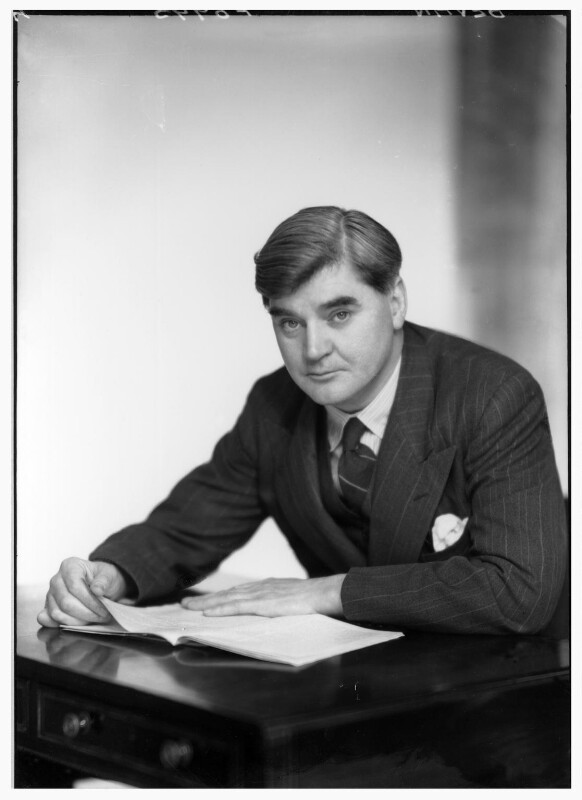
Aneurin Bevan, the founder of the NHS

Calls for a "unified medical service" can be dated back to the Minority Report of the Royal Commission on the Poor Law in 1909. However, following the Dewar Report of 1912, the Highlands and Islands Medical Service was brought into being that provided centrally planned healthcare services, over half of Scotland's landmass, at minimal cost to patients – in many ways a prototype for NHS Scotland.

Somerville Hastings, President of the Socialist Medical Association, successfully proposed a resolution at the 1934 Labour Party Conference that the party should be committed to the establishment of a State Health Service.

Following the 1942 Beveridge Report's recommendation to create "comprehensive health and rehabilitation services for prevention and cure of disease", cross-party consensus emerged on introducing a National Health Service of some description. Conservative MP and Health Minister, Henry Willink later advanced this notion of a National Health Service in 1944 with his consultative White Paper "A National Health Service" which was circulated in full and short versions to colleagues, as well as in newsreel.

When Clement Attlee's Labour Party won the 1945 election he appointed Aneurin Bevan as Health Minister. Bevan then embarked upon what the official historian of the NHS, Charles Webster, called an "audacious campaign" to take charge of the form the NHS finally took. Bevan's National Health Service was proposed in Westminster legislation for England and Wales from 1946 and Scotland from 1947, and the Northern Ireland Parliament's Public Health Services Act 1947. NHS Wales was split from NHS (England) in 1969 when control was passed to the Secretary of State for Wales. According to one history of the NHS, "In some respects the war had made things easier. In anticipation of massive air raid casualties, the Emergency Medical Service had brought the country's municipal and voluntary hospitals into one umbrella organisation, showing that a national hospital service was possible". Webster wrote in 2002 that "the Luftwaffe achieved in months what had defeated politicians and planners for at least two decades".

The NHS was born out of the ideal that healthcare should be available to all, regardless of wealth. Although being freely accessible regardless of wealth maintained Henry Willink's principle of free healthcare for all, Conservative MPs were in favour of maintaining local administration of the NHS through existing arrangements with local authorities fearing that an NHS which owned hospitals on a national scale would lose the personal relationship between doctor and patient.

Conservative MPs voted in favour of their amendment to Bevan's Bill to maintain local control and ownership of hospitals and against Bevan's plan for national ownership of all hospitals. The Labour government defeated Conservative amendments resulting in the implementation of a centralised health service model.

The National Health Service has never been a single organisation. The initial structure in 1948 introduced a number of management bodies for England and Wales. These were as follows:

- 14 regional hospital boards (RHBs)
- 36 boards of governors for teaching hospitals (BGs)
- 388 hospital management committees (HMCs)
- 138 executive councils (ECs)
- 147 local health authorities (LHAs)

Local voluntary hospitals were brought into national public ownership. On the 5 July 1948, 1,143 voluntary hospitals comprising approximately 90,000 beds and 1,545 municipal hospitals with around 390,000 beds were taken over by the NHS in England and Wales.

Community and domiciliary health services such as home nurses, public and environmental health and health prevention/promotion continued to be run by separate, elected local municipal Authorities or Councils.

The first general medical services contract was brought in as part of the NHS's inception. This built on arrangements with general practitioners (GP's) as part of the National Insurance Act 1911. This resulted initially in 18,000 self-employed general practitioners.

At its launch by Bevan on 5 July 1948 it had at its heart three core principles: That it meet the needs of everyone, that it be free at the point of delivery, and that it be based on clinical need, not ability to pay.

Three years after the founding of the NHS, Bevan resigned from the Labour government in opposition to the introduction of charges for the provision of dentures, dentists, and glasses; resigning in support was fellow minister and future Prime Minister Harold Wilson. The following year, Winston Churchill's Conservative government introduced prescription fees. However, Wilson's government abolished them in 1965; they were later re-introduced but with exemptions for those on low income. These charges were the first of many controversies over changes to the NHS throughout its history. The Tony Blair Labour governments would later implement large scale financing arrangements with private builders in private finance initiatives and joint ventures.

From its earliest days, the cultural history of the NHS has shown its place in British society reflected and debated in film, TV, cartoons and literature. The NHS had a prominent slot during the 2012 London Summer Olympics opening ceremony directed by Danny Boyle, being described as "the institution which more than any other unites our nation".

== Eligibility for treatment ==
Some health services are free to everyone, including accident and emergency room treatment, registering with a GP and attending GP appointments, treatment for some infectious diseases, compulsory psychiatric treatment, and some family planning services.

Everyone living in the UK can use the NHS without being asked to pay the full cost of the service, though NHS dentistry and optometry have standard charges in each of the four national health services in the UK. Most patients in England have to pay charges for prescriptions though some patients are exempted.

People who are not ordinarily resident (including British citizens who may have paid National Insurance contributions in the past) may have to pay for services, with some exceptions such as refugees. Patients who do not qualify for free treatment are asked to pay in advance or to sign a written promise to pay for treatment.

There are some other categories of people who are exempt from the residence requirements such as specific government workers, those in the armed forces stationed overseas, and those working outside the UK as a missionary for an organisation with its principal place of business in the UK.

Citizens of the EU or European Economic Area (EEA) nations holding a valid European Health Insurance Card (EHIC) and people from certain other countries with which the UK has reciprocal arrangements concerning health care can get NHS emergency treatment without charge. People from the EU without an EHIC, Provisional Replacement Certificate (PRC) or S1 or S2 visa may have to pay.

People applying for a visa or immigration application for more than six months have to pay an immigration health surcharge when applying for their visa and can then get treatment on the same basis as a resident. There are some people who do not have to pay, including health and care workers and their dependents, dependents of some members of the armed forces, and victims of slavery or domestic violence. In 2024, the charges were £776 per year for students, their dependents, those on Youth Mobility Schemes, and those under aged 18, and £1,035 for all other applicants who are not covered by exemptions.

== Funding ==
The NHS is funded from the general budget, partially accounted for by National Insurance contributions, plus around 1% of patient charges for some services.

In 2022/3, £181.7 billion was spent by the Department of Health and Social Care on services in England. More than 94% of spend was on salaries and medicines.

In 2024/5, the NHS in Wales budgeted £11.74 billion for health and social care, which was 49% of its budget.

£19.5 billion was budgeted for health and social care in Scotland for 2024/5.

£7.3 billion was budgeted for health in Northern Ireland in 2024/5.

== Issues ==
=== Funding and costs ===
Public healthcare spending as a share of gdp

The funding of the NHS is usually an election issue, and fell under scrutiny during the COVID-19 pandemic.

In July 2022, The Telegraph reported that think tank Civitas found that health spending was costing about £10,000 per household in the UK. They said that this was the third highest share of GDP of any nation in Europe and claimed that the UK "has one of the most costly health systems – and some of the worst outcomes". The findings were made before the government increased health spending significantly, with a 1.25% increase in National Insurance, in April 2022. Civitas said that "runaway" health spending in the UK had increased by more than any country despite the drop in national income due to the COVID pandemic.

The Labour Government elected in 2024 stated that their policy was that the "NHS is broken". They announced an immediate stocktake of current pressures led by Labour peer Lord Ara Darzi. This was to be followed by development of a new "10 year plan" for the NHS to replace the NHS Long Term Plan published in 2019.

The potential rise of the cost of social care has been signalled by research. Professor Helen Stokes-Lampard of the Royal College of GPs said in 2017, "It's a great testament to medical research, and the NHS, that we are living longer – but we need to ensure that our patients are living longer with a good quality of life. For this to happen we need a properly funded, properly staffed health and social care sector with general practice, hospitals and social care all working together – and all communicating well with each other, in the best interests of delivering safe care to all our patients".

=== Employment and waiting lists ===
EU workers joining and leaving the NHS in England, annual variation in absolute numbers (2012–2017) Joiner Leaver

In June 2018, the Royal College of Physicians calculated that medical training places need to be increased from 7,500 to 15,000 by 2030 to take account of part-time working among other factors. At that time there were 47,800 consultants working in the UK of which 15,700 were physicians. About 20% of consultants work less than full-time.

On 6 June 2022, The Guardian said that a survey of more than 20,000 frontline staff by the nursing trade union and professional body, the Royal College of Nursing, found that only a quarter of shifts had the planned number of registered nurses on duty.

The NHS will potentially have a shortage of general practitioners. From 2015 to 2022, the number of GPs fell by 1,622 and some of those continuing to work have changed to work part-time.

In June 2023, the delayed NHS Long Term Workforce Plan was announced, to train doctors and nurses and create new roles within the health service.

The Welsh and UK governments announced a partnership on 23 September 2024 to reduce NHS waiting lists in England and Wales during the Labour Party Conference in Liverpool. This collaboration aimed to share best practices and tackle common challenges. Previously, Eluned Morgan rejected a Conservative proposal for treating Welsh patients in England. The Welsh Conservatives welcomed the new partnership as overdue, while Plaid Cymru criticised it as insufficient for addressing deeper issues within the Welsh NHS.

==== Mental health ====
The National Audit Office found in 2018 that mental health provisions for children and young people will not meet growing demand, despite promises of increased funding. 25% of young people needing mental health services could get NHS help in 2018. The Department of Health and Social Care hoped to raise the ratio to 35%. Efforts to improve mental health provisions could reveal previously unmet demand.

It was reported in 2023 that one in four patients throughout the UK were waiting more than three months to see an NHS mental health professional, with 6% waiting at least a year.

In March 2025 the Labour government announced it would be making some changes to the Personal Independence Payment (PIP) eligibility for some mental health conditions, taking funds from patients to support its NHS resident doctors 29% wage increase after industrial action instigated by the British Medical Association.

== Performance ==
Performance of the NHS is generally assessed separately at the level of England, Wales, Scotland and Northern Ireland.

Since 2004 the left-leaning Commonwealth Fund, a US health charity, has produced surveys, "Mirror, Mirror on the Wall", comparing the performance of health systems in 11 wealthy countries in which the UK generally ranks highly. For example, in 2010 the report put the United Kingdom health systems above those of Germany, Canada and the United States; the NHS was deemed the most efficient among those health systems studied. In the 2021 survey the NHS dropped from first overall to fourth as it had fallen in key areas, including 'access to care and equity'.

The Euro Health Consumer Index attempted to rank the NHS against other European health systems from 2014 to 2018, ranking it 16th out of 35 countries in 2018.

The right-leaning think tank Civitas produced an International Health Care Outcomes Index in 2022 ranking the performance of the UK health care system against 18 similar, wealthy countries since 2000. It excluded the impact of the COVID-19 pandemic as data stopped in 2019. The UK was near the bottom of most tables except households who faced catastrophic health spending.

A 2018 study by the King's Fund, Health Foundation, Nuffield Trust, and the Institute for Fiscal Studies to mark the NHS 70th anniversary concluded that the main weakness of the NHS was healthcare outcomes. Mortality for cancer, heart attacks and stroke, was higher than average among comparable countries. The NHS was doing well at protecting people from heavy financial costs when ill. Waiting times were about the same, and the management of longterm illness was better than in other comparable countries. Efficiency was good, with low administrative costs and high use of cheaper generic medicines. Twenty-nine hospital trusts and boards out of 157 had not met any waiting-time target in the year 2017–2018.

In 2019, The Times, commenting on a study in the British Medical Journal, reported that "Britain spent the least on health, £3,000 per person, compared with an average of £4,400, and had the highest number of deaths that might have been prevented with prompt treatment". The BMJ study compared "the healthcare systems of other developed countries in spending, staff numbers and avoidable deaths".

Overall satisfaction with the NHS in 2021 fell, more sharply in Scotland than in England, 17 points to 36% – the lowest level since 1997 according to the British Social Attitudes Survey. Dissatisfaction with hospital and GP waiting times were the biggest cause of the fall.

The NHS Confederation polled 182 health leaders and 9 in 10 warned that inadequate capital funding harmed their "ability to meet safety requirements for patients" in health settings including hospitals, ambulance, community and mental health services and GP practices.

=== Public perception of the NHS ===
In 2016 it was reported that there appeared to be support for higher taxation to pay for extra spending on the NHS as an opinion poll in 2016 showed that 70% of people were willing to pay an extra penny in the pound in income tax if the money were ringfenced and guaranteed for the NHS. Two thirds of respondents to a King's Fund poll, reported in September 2017, favoured increased taxation to help finance the NHS.

A YouGov poll reported in May 2018 showed that 74% of the UK public believed there were too few nurses.

The trade union, Unite, said in March 2019 that the NHS had been under pressure as a result of economic austerity.

A 2018 public survey reported that public satisfaction with the NHS had fallen from 70% in 2010 to 53% in 2018. The NHS is consistently ranked as the institution that makes people proudest to be British, beating the royal family, Armed Forces and the BBC. One 2019 survey ranked nurses and doctors – not necessarily NHS staff – amongst the most trustworthy professions in the UK.

In November 2022 a survey by Ipsos and the Health Foundation found just a third of respondents agreed the NHS gave a good service nationally, and 82% thought the NHS needed more funding. 62% expected care standards to fall during the following 12 months. Sorting out pressure and workload on staff and increasing staff numbers were the chief priorities the poll found. Improving A&E waiting times and routine services were also concerns. Just 10% of UK respondents felt their government had the correct plans for the NHS. The Health Foundation stated in spite of these concerns, the public is committed to the founding principles of the NHS and 90% of respondents believe the NHS should be free, 89% believe NHS should provide a comprehensive service for everyone, and 84% believe the NHS should be funded mainly through taxation.

=== Role in combating Coronavirus pandemic ===
In 2020, the NHS issued medical advice in combating COVID-19 and partnered with tech companies to create computer dashboards to help combat the nation's coronavirus pandemic. During the pandemic, the NHS also established integrated COVID into its 1-1-1 service line as well. Following his discharge from the St. Thomas' Hospital in London on 13 April 2020 after being diagnosed with COVID-19, British Prime Minister Boris Johnson described NHS medical care as "astonishing" and said that the "NHS saved my life. No question". In this time, the NHS underwent major re-organisation to prepare for the COVID-19 pandemic.

On 5 July 2021, Queen Elizabeth II awarded the NHS the George Cross. The George Cross, the highest award for gallantry available to civilians and is slightly lower in stature to the Victoria Cross, is bestowed for acts of the greatest heroism or most conspicuous courage. In a handwritten note the Queen said the award was being made to all NHS staff past and present for their "courage, compassion and dedication" throughout the pandemic.

In October 2022, as part of their efforts to tackle mental health challenges made worse by the pandemic, the NHS partnered with Israeli tech company Taliaz, stating that their AI-powered software translates complex genetic, demographic and clinical patient data into timesaving and cost-saving assessment, management and prescribing support tools for healthcare providers.

== Hospital beds ==
In 2020, the UK had 2.43 hospital beds per 1,000 people. In September 2017, the King's Fund documented the number of NHS hospital beds in England as 142,000, describing this as less than 50% of the number 30 years previously. In 2019, one tenth of the beds in the UK were occupied by a patient who was alcohol-dependent.

== Use of alternative medicine ==
Since 2000, the NHS has been under significant criticism for continuing to provide and trial the pseudoscientific methods of alternative medicine. A 2010 Commons report noted that homeopathy "has been funded and provided on the NHS since its inception in 1948".

The NHS also evaluated the Lightning Process for paediatric CFS/ME in the SMILE trial - "The trial population was drawn from the Bath and Bristol NHS specialist paediatric CFS or ME service", with the journal later acknowledging "the study was not fully ICMJE compliant".

In clinical guidance, NICE's 2009 low-back-pain guideline has continued to tell clinicians to "Consider offering a course of acupuncture needling comprising up to a maximum of 10 sessions over a period of up to 12 weeks".

== NHS music releases ==
The NHS have released various charity singles including:

- 2013: NHS Choir – "A Bridge over You"
- 2015: National Health Singers – "Yours"
- 2018: NHS Voices – "With a Little Help from My Friends"
- 2018: National Health Singers – "NHS 70: Won't Let Go"
- 2020: NHS and keyworkers – "You'll Never Walk Alone"

== See also ==
- Department of Health and Social Care
- History of the National Health Service (England)
- History of NHS Scotland
- History of NHS Wales
- National Care Service
- Private providers of NHS services
- Special health authority
- Criticism of the National Health Service (England)
- Manx Care

General

- Healthcare in the United Kingdom
- Health in the United Kingdom
- History of public health in the United Kingdom
