= History of NHS Wales =

NHS Wales (Welsh: GIG Cymru) is the publicly funded healthcare system of Wales. NHS Wales was originally formed as part of the same NHS structure created by the National Health Service Act 1946 but powers over the NHS in Wales came under the Secretary of State for Wales in 1969. In turn, responsibility for NHS Wales was passed to the Welsh Assembly and Executive under devolution in 1999.

== Structural change ==
The five health authorities as they existed between 1996 and 2003.

In 2001, Jane Hutt as Minister for Health and Social Services, announced that the Welsh Assembly Government intended reform the NHS in Wales with a suite of policies including removing the health authorities and replacing them with 22 local health boards.

The draft NHS (Wales) Bill was published in 2002, and included provisions to implement the Welsh Assembly Government's policies. Many of its contents were passed within the National Health Service Reform and Health Care Professions Act 2002.

The Health (Wales) Act 2003 was passed and contained 3 substantive measures: reforming community health councils, the establishment of the Wales Centre for Health, the establishment of Health Professions Wales.

The five health authorities were replaced by 22 local health boards in 2003. In 2004, the local health boards were invited to consider "proposals for integration". In 2006, Health Professions Wales was absorbed by the Welsh Assembly Government. The 22 local health boards were replaced by seven local health boards in 2009. Public Health Wales was created from the merger of National Public Health Service, Wales Centre for Health, Welsh Cancer Intelligence & Surveillance Unit, Screening Services Wales, and the Congenital Anomaly Register and Information Service for Wales.

== See also ==
- NHS Wales
