= Health in the United Kingdom =

Health in the United Kingdom refers to the overall health of the population of the United Kingdom. This includes overall trends such as life expectancy and mortality rates, mental health of the population and the suicide rate, smoking rates, alcohol consumption, prevalence of diseases within the population and obesity in the United Kingdom. Three of these – smoking rates, alcohol consumption and obesity – were above the OECD average in 2015.

Health is a devolved matter, with England, Northern Ireland, Scotland and Wales each being overseen by different public health bodies and healthcare systems.

For details of health in each country, see:

- Health in England
- Health in Northern Ireland
- Health in Scotland
- Health in Wales

Life expectancy in the country consistently rose from the 18th century onward, but the rate of increase slowed from 2011 and stagnated in 2018. Social trends such as obesity rates within the country have consistently risen since the 1970s, while smoking rates have consistently decreased since then.

== Health status ==
The Nuffield Trust and the Association for Young People's Health produced a report on the health of young people in February 2019, comparing the UK with 18 other similar European countries. They found that the UK had the highest rates of obesity, the highest rate of young people living with a longstanding condition, apart from Finland and Sweden, and, among 11 year olds, very low rates of exercise. However, the UK had some of the lowest smoking, suicide and road accidents.

General health (self-identified)	England and Wales					
General health (self-identified)	2001		2011		2021	
General health (self-identified)	Number	%	Number	%	Number	%
Very good health	35,676,210	68.6%	26,434,409	47.1%	28,827,308	48.4%
Good health	35,676,210	68.6%	19,094,820	34.1%	20,046,220	33.6%
Fair health	11,568,363	22.2%	7,401,881	13.2%	7,597,001	12.7%
Bad health	4,797,343	9.2%	2,428,668	4.3%	2,412,358	4.0%
Very bad health	4,797,343	9.2%	716,134	1.3%	714,655	1.2%
Total	52,041,916	100%	56,075,912	100%	59,597,542	100.0%

=== Life expectancy ===
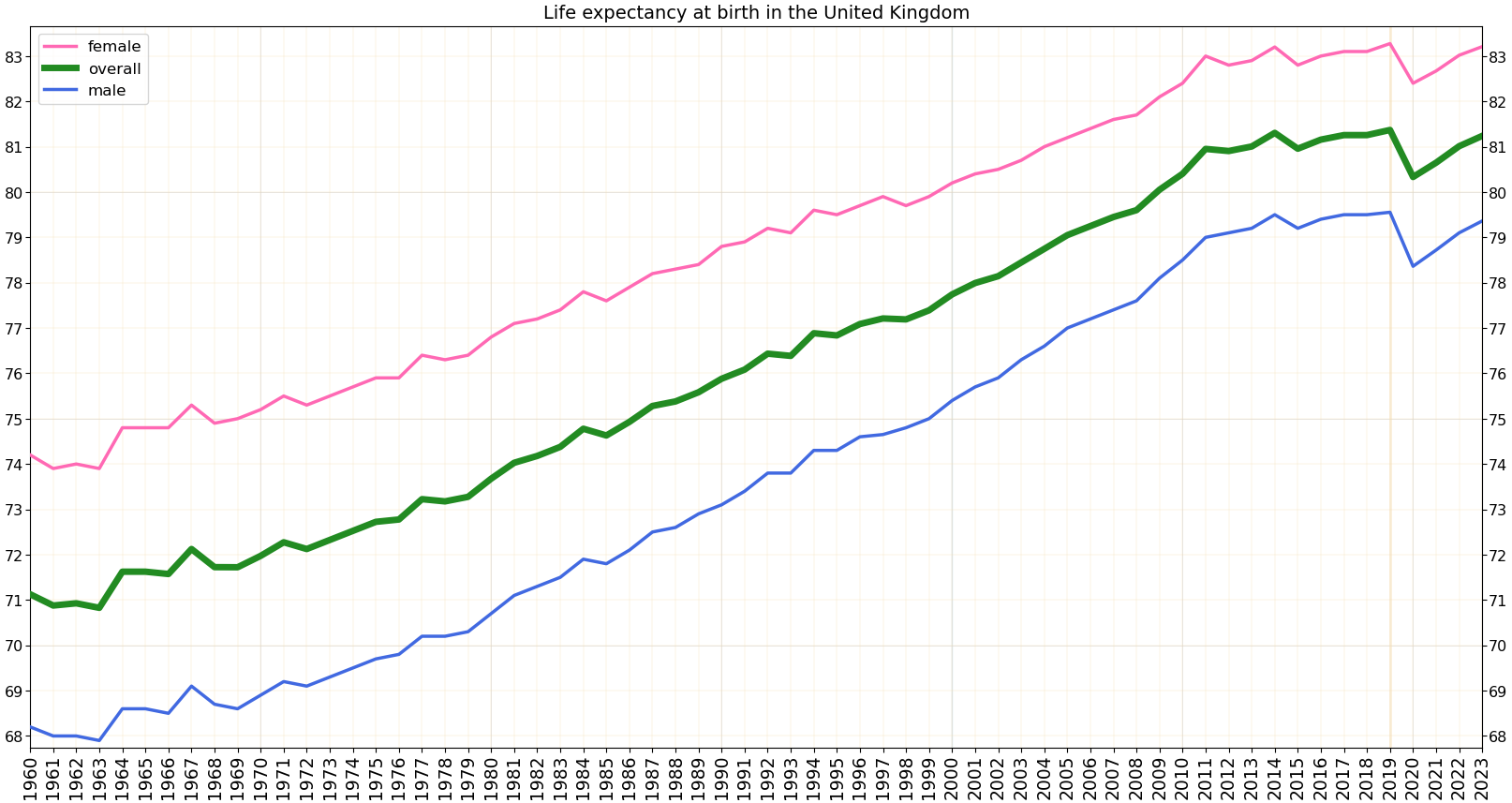
Life expectancy at birth in UK

In 2013, life expectancy at birth was 83 years for women and 79 for men. In 2016, life expectancy was found to be rising more slowly in the UK than in comparable nations. In 2018, life expectancy in the UK stopped increasing. There were 50,100 excess deaths during winter 2017/2018, mostly among older people, and the highest number since 1976; cold weather and problems with flu vaccine were blamed. In January 2024, The BMJ reported that data is suggesting that "life expectancy in the UK seems to have reduced by around half a year per person", partly due to the COVID-19 pandemic. A report by the Organisation for Economic Co-operation and Development (OECD) that was published in November 2024 indicated that the United Kingdom has the worst life expectancy in western Europe.

=== Infant mortality ===
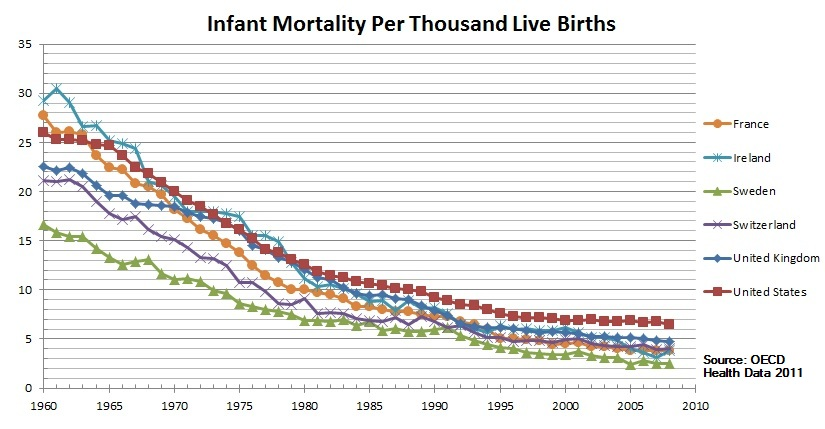
The reduction in infant mortality between 1960 and 2008 for the United Kingdom in comparison with France, Ireland, Sweden, Switzerland, and the United States. The overall trend has meant a large improvement in health inside the United Kingdom.

Infant mortality rates have been decreasing since the early 1840s, due to general improvements in sanitation and diet and more recently because of improvements in midwifery and neonatal intensive care.

=== Obesity ===
The rising rates of childhood obesity were described as a "national emergency" by Health Secretary Jeremy Hunt in February 2016. 28.1% of adults in the United Kingdom were recognised as clinically obese with a Body Mass Index (BMI) greater than 30 in 2014. The increasing numbers of people with obesity leads to the growing number of diabetes diagnoses.

=== Diabetes ===
Diabetes is a major concern in the UK as the number of diagnoses have doubled in the past 15 years. In 2021 there were 4.1 million people in the UK diagnosed with diabetes, 90% of them having type 2. There were a further 1 million people with undiagnosed type 2 diabetes and 13.6 million people were at risk of developing type 2 diabetes, half of which could be prevented.

=== Smoking rates ===
In 1974, 45% of the British population smoked. The smoking rate was down to 30% by the early-1990s, 21% by 2010, and 19.3% by 2013, the lowest level for eighty years. In 2015, smoking rates in England had fallen to 16.9%.

=== Cancer ===
There were 361,216 cancer diagnoses in 2014 in the United Kingdom. Breast cancer is the most common cancer in the UK (around 56,000 women and 375 men are diagnosed with the disease every year). Cancer Research UK estimates that 15% of UK cancers are caused by smoking, and 3-4% of UK cancers are related to alcohol consumption.

=== Mental health ===
In 2014, the Adult Psychiatric Morbidity Survey reported that 17% of those surveyed in England met the criteria for a common mental disorder. About 37% of those were accessing mental health treatment. Those more severely affected were more likely to be accessing services. In 2017 a survey found that 65% of Britons have experienced a mental health problem, with 26% having had a panic attack and 42% said they had suffered from depression.

Rates of severe anxiety and depression among unemployed people increased from 10.1% in June 2013 to 15.2% in March 2017. In the general population the increase was from 3.4% to 4.1%.

==== Suicide ====
5,608 and 5,675 people aged 15 and over died by suicide in 2009 to 2011 respectively. The share of deaths percentage wise in which suicide has contributed to had roughly remained under 1% since the 1990s. 2019 figures showed that suicides made up 0.9% of deaths in the United Kingdom. The suicide rate rose by 6% in England between quarter 4 of 2022 to quarter 4 of 2023. In 2023, 6,069 deaths by suicide were registered just in England and Wales (i.e. excluding Scotland and Northern Ireland), marking the highest suicide rate in England and Wales since 1999.

Suicide is the leading cause of death for men under the age of 50 in the United Kingdom.

=== HIV/AIDS ===
An estimated 101,200 people are living with HIV in the UK (0.16% of the population), 13% of whom are unaware of their infection. Of those, 69% are men and 31% were women. Just under half of those living with HIV are gay or bisexual men. 1 in 7 gay or bisexual men in London are living with HIV, compared to 1 in 25 in the rest of the UK and less than 1 in 500 for the general population.

6,095 people were newly diagnosed during 2015, a trend which has remained relatively constant since 2010. An estimated 39% of diagnoses were late (likely to have been living with the virus for over three years).

Disabled population pyramid in 2021 in England and Wales

=== Disability ===
In 2014 more than 11 million British people (excluding Northern Ireland) were reported to have a long term impairment or disability. The incidence rises with age. About 6% of children, 16% of working age adults and 45% of pensioners are reported as having a disability.

=== Life expectancy ===
The COVID-19 pandemic caused a one-year drop in UK life expectancy. A 2024 study by the King's Fund found that life expectancy at birth in England fell in 2020 by about 1.3 years for males and 0.9 years for females – the largest decline seen since World War II – before stabilising in subsequent years.

== Vaccination ==
In the United Kingdom, the purchase and distribution of vaccines is managed centrally, and recommended vaccines are provided for free by the NHS.

=== Social and economic issues ===
The Black Report, published by the Conservative government in 1980, highlighted the relationship between socioeconomic status and health outcomes. It demonstrated greater inequality of mortality between occupational classes I and V both in 1970–72 and 1959–63 than in 1949–53.

== Climate change ==
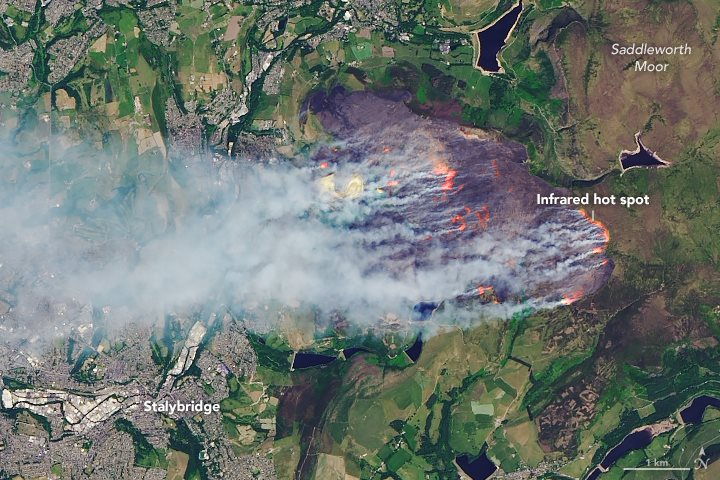
Wildfire on Saddleworth Moor, 2018

The National Health Service describes climate change as a "health emergency", citing the effects of heat waves, floods, and storms on health, as well as the increased spread of infectious diseases such as tick-borne encephalitis and vibriosis.

Due to climate change, the UK has experienced a significant increase in severe heat waves which have dire health consequences. The 2022 heatwaves contributed to nearly 3000 excess deaths – meaning people who are not expected to die during this period. This represents the highest number of deaths during heatwaves since 2004. Most of the extra deaths occurred in those aged over 65. Without climate change mitigation or adaptation measures, heat-related deaths could increase sixfold by the 2050s, particularly affecting children, the elderly and people with pre-existing conditions.

Flooding in the UK presents another major threat, currently affecting over six million people. This number expected to rise significantly as temperatures increase. Beyond physical risks, floods have severe long-lasting mental health consequences for survivors, including post-traumatic stress disorder (PTSD).

== See also ==
- Healthcare in the United Kingdom
- Health inequality in the United Kingdom
- Health in England
- History of public health in the United Kingdom
- Royal Society for Public Health
- UK Health Security Agency
- Office for Health Improvement and Disparities
