= History of public health in the United Kingdom =

The history of public health in the United Kingdom covers public health in the United Kingdom since about 1700. The history saw incremental progress against systemic inequities. Legislative milestones, scientific breakthroughs, and grassroots advocacy collectively transformed a landscape once dominated by disease and deprivation. Hospitals moved from the periphery to the center of public health services. Challenges like very bad urban sanitation, epidemics, tuberculosis, and infant mortality were largely resolved by the early 20th century. The foundations laid by 19th-century reformers enabled the creation of a comprehensive national health system, epitomized by the National Health Service in 1948.

== 18th century ==
The 18th century in Great Britain was a transitional period in public health, with advances but also persistent problems due to urbanisation, limited medical knowledge, and fragmented governance. There were early attempts to address sanitation, disease control, and urban planning, but these efforts were often constrained by prevailing scientific misconceptions and socioeconomic disparities. There was a struggle to manage rapid urban growth; miasma theory dominated health practices, quarantine and inoculation measures were implemented locally, and there was a gradual shift toward structural reforms influenced by catastrophic events like plagues and fires. These developments laid hesitant groundwork for the more systematic public health reforms of the Victorian era, in an era of industrialisation and densely populated cities.

=== Industrial revolution and urbanization ===
With the onset of the Industrial Revolution and the rapid growth of overcrowded cities, living standards amongst the working population began to worsen, with cramped and highly unsanitary conditions. A severe long-term shortage of cheap housing led to the rapid growth of slums, and mortality rates began to rise alarmingly, almost doubling in Birmingham and Liverpool. Thomas Malthus warned of the dangers of overpopulation in 1798. His ideas, as well as those of Jeremy Bentham, became very influential in government circles in the early years of the 19th century. Public health started to improve in the late 18th century: a trend that was to continue over the next two centuries: a social evil was identified, private philanthropists brought attention to it, and changing public opinion led to government action.

The practice of medicine grew rapidly in the 18th century, as seen in the rapid growth in voluntary hospitals in England. The acceptance of vaccination quickly followed the pioneering work of Edward Jenner in treating smallpox. James Lind's discovery of the causes of scurvy amongst sailors and its mitigation by eating fruit on lengthy voyages was published in 1754 and led to its adoption by the Royal Navy.

The broader public was also educated about health matters: in 1752 the British physician Sir John Pringle published Observations on the Diseases of the Army in Camp and Garrison, which pointed out the importance of adequate ventilation in the barracks and the provision of latrines for the soldiers.

=== Infant mortality ===
Infant mortality in the United Kingdom greatly reduced between 1700 and 2025. Good national statistics begin in 1837; before then historians use local studies.

In the early 18th century, infant mortality rates were extremely high:

- 1700–1749: The infant mortality rate in London was 342 deaths per 1,000 live births.
- 1700–1740: Nationally, infant mortality reached about 20% of all live-born infants.

== 19th century ==
Tuberculosis was the main cause of death, especially in fast-growing urban areas where very bad sanitation and polluted water supplies spread germs to poor people. However, until professional medicine realised that germs caused infectious diseases, progress was limited. Between 1851 and 1910, tuberculosis caused about 4 million deaths in England and Wales alone, representing nearly a quarter of all deaths during this period.

=== Infant mortality ===
Historians have developed estimates before 1837 for several localities. Finally in that year, the introduction of civil registration of births and deaths enabled the nationwide tracking of infant mortality by date, location and cause.

The 19th century saw substantial improvements in infant survival:

- 1800–1824: Infant mortality for Quakers in London fell to 151 deaths per 1,000 live births.
- 1837–1844: The national infant mortality rate was around 148 deaths per 1,000 live births.
- 1839–1844: There was a steady increase in the proportion of neonatal to infant deaths, possibly indicating improved registration practices.
- 1870s: The Registrar General's office began regularly reporting infant mortality rates.

=== Legislation ===
A series of laws passed by Parliament and affecting England and Wales marked a shift towards proactive public health measures. They concerned sanitation, disease prevention, and living conditions in urban areas, as well as national and local rules of oversight. "Sanitary reform" was a common refrain of Conservative politicians in their landslide victory in 1874. Liberal politicians tended to ridicule it, but Disraeli had a broader vision of "sanitary", saying: "that phrase so little understood [included] most of the civilizing influences of humanity." What the voters really wanted, in Disraeli's opinion, was healthier conditions at home and at work, and across their towns.

- The Public Health Act 1848 established the General Board of Health and allowed local authorities to set up local boards of health. It empowered them to appoint a Medical Officer of Health (MOH) to take charge of local issues, especially sanitation. The law marked the beginning of active state involvement in public health matters.
- The Vaccination Act 1853 made vaccination against smallpox compulsory for all infants under three months old, while the Vaccination Act 1867 extended compulsory vaccination to all children under the age of 14.
- The Public Health Act 1875 consolidated the previous public health legislation.

==== Child labour ====
Evangelical religious forces reflected Victorian morality by taking the lead in identifying the evils of child labour, and legislating against them. Their anger at the contradiction between the conditions on the ground for children of the poor and the middle-class notion of childhood as a time of innocence led to the first campaigns for the imposition of legal protection for children. Reformers attacked child labor from the 1830s onward. The campaign that led to the Factory Acts was spearheaded by rich philanthropists of the era, especially Anthony Ashley-Cooper, 7th Earl of Shaftesbury, who introduced bills in Parliament to mitigate the exploitation of children in the workplace. In 1833, he introduced the Ten Hours Act 1833, which provided that children working in the cotton and woollen mills must be aged nine or above; no person under the age of eighteen was to work more than ten hours a day or eight hours on a Saturday; and no one under twenty-five was to work nights. The Factory Act 1844 said children 9–13 years could work for at most 9 hours a day, with a lunch break. Further legal interventions throughout the century increased the level of childhood protection, despite the resistance from the laissez-faire attitudes against government interference by factory owners. Parliament respected laissez-faire in the case of adult men, and there was minimal interference in the Victorian era.

Unemployed street children suffered too, as novelist Charles Dickens revealed to a large middle class audience the horrors of London street life.

=== Urban crisis ===
In the first four decades of the 19th century alone, London's population doubled and even greater growth rates were recorded in the new industrial towns, such as Leeds and Manchester. From 1801 to 1851, the proportion of Englanders living in cities over 20,000 more than doubled from 17% to 38%.

This rapid urbanisation exacerbated the spread of disease in the large conurbations that built up around the factories. These settlements were cramped and primitive, with no organised sanitation. Disease was inevitable, and its incubation in these areas was encouraged by the poor lifestyle of the inhabitants. Not enough new housing was built, and people squeezed into small, dirty apartments, and drank dirty water. One result was high rates of tuberculosis, which became the leading cause of death.

==== Liverpool ====
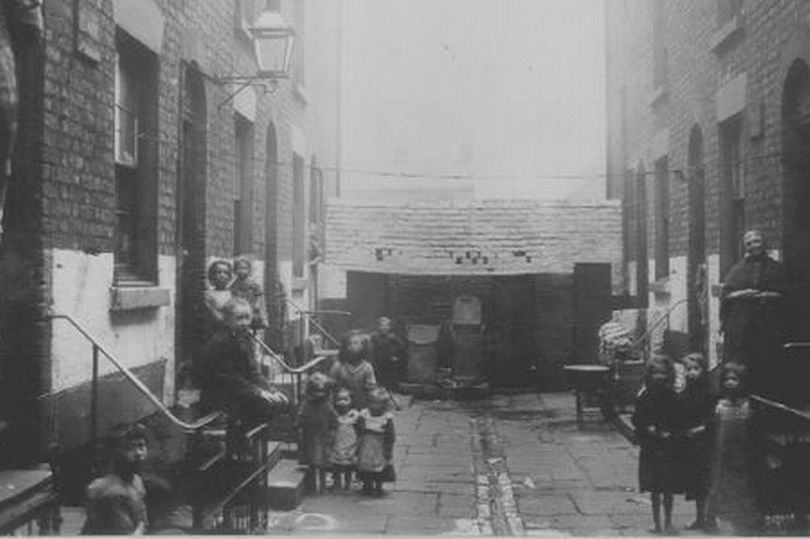
19th-century court housing Liverpool

Very rapid migration came from rural England, and especially from Ireland during the famine years 1847–1852. This led to severe overcrowding and very poor sanitation. Housing in Liverpool was dark, poorly ventilated, damp and overcrowded, with no provision for human or horse waste. The people stuffed in tiny apartments used privies out back, and it was common practice to dispose of the contents by spreading them over the courts. As a result, many people waded in sewage. The cities faced several cholera outbreaks.

These hardships galvanised public health reforms and philanthropic efforts. Reformers led by William Rathbone worked tirelessly to improve healthcare and education. In 1822 a commission of sewers was established and over the next 20 years built 30 miles of sewers, but these were for surface water drainage only; houses did not connect to their drains.

William Henry Duncan (1805–1863) was Medical Officer of Health (1847–1863). He was the first Medical Officer anywhere in the UK. He worked energetically to upgrade the city's sanitation, especially in the face of overwhelming migration from Ireland during the great famine.

=== Chadwick and sanitation solutions ===
Edwin Chadwick (1800–1890) identified bad sanitation as a major threat to public health in crowded cities. He promoted major construction programs in urban sewers and water supplies . He pioneered the use of systematic surveys to identify all phases of a complex social problem, and pioneered the use of systematic long-term inspection programmes to make sure the reforms operated as planned. Similar sanitation programs were developed by most major cities in Europe and North America.

Following a serious outbreak of typhus in 1838, Chadwick convinced the Poor Law Board that an enquiry was urgently required. Chadwick sent questionnaires to every Poor Law Union, and talked to surveyors, builders, prison governors, police officers and factory inspectors to obtain additional data about the lives of the poor. He edited the information himself, and prepared it for publication in 1842 at his own expense. It became a best-seller. His Report on The Sanitary Condition of the Labouring Population of Great Britain caught the public imagination and was soon incorporated into English law.

Chadwick argued eight main points, emphasizing the absolute necessity of better water supplies and of a drainage system to remove waste, as ways to lower the death rate. He saw that every house needed a permanent water supply, rather than the intermittent supplies from standpipes that were often provided. He proposed each house would have a constant water supply, and privies would ensure that soil was discharged into egg-shaped sewers, to be carried away and spread on the land as manure, preventing rivers from becoming polluted. Chadwick understood that both water supply and drainage were important, since there had to be enough sewers to carry the waste away. Chadwick later helped to ensure that the Waterworks Clauses Act 1847 limited profits, and required them to provide a constant supply of wholesome water for houses, and a supply for cleansing sewers and watering streets.

==== Dirt causes miasma that cause cholera ====
Cholera was the main concern. Officials knew that the disease had hit India hard in 1818 and was steadily progressing westward. There was no known cure, and about a third of the patients died. Doctors assumed it was caused by breathing "miasma"—mysterious air particles produced by rotting waste. Sanitation using sewers to move out all the waste was seen as the solution. Early on no one realized it was caused by a germ that passed through the water supply from person to person. The first case appeared in England in 1833. A quarantine was imposed on shipping in the seaports, much to the dismay of merchants and sailors. By 1832 there were 52,000 deaths, including 10,000 in Edinburgh and Glasgow alone. It focused on cities but not on social status; the victims represented every class of society. Local governments ordered whitewashing houses with chloride of lime or burning barrels of tar in the streets in order to dissipate the supposed miasma causing the disease. The epidemics petered out, then reappeared every few years. Major cholera epidemics struck Britain in 1848–1849 with 70,000 deaths; 1853–1854 with 30,000 deaths; and 1866 with 18,000 deaths.

===== John Snow discovers the actual cause: drinking bad water =====
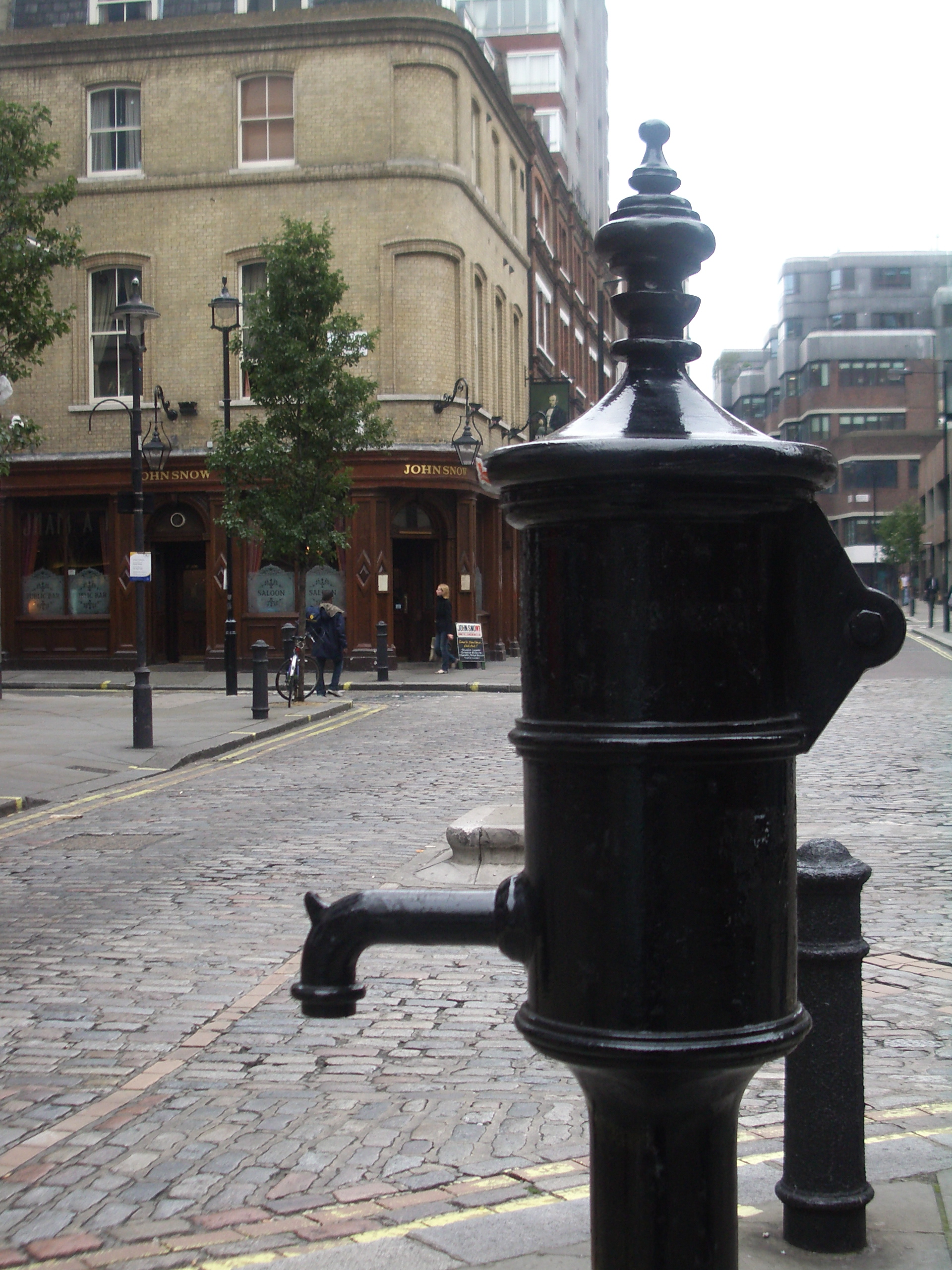
A replica of the famous London pump in SoHo. After John Snow closed it down there were no more new cases of cholera.

Chadwick was working on removing the waste and dirt as the solution, but the precise cause of the disease was not known until the work of John Snow in 1854. That year there was a severe outbreak of cholera in the upper class Soho district of London. It was part of the worldwide 1846–1860 cholera pandemic. It prompted Snow to map the homes of people who got sick in Soho and show they had all been drinking water that came from one neighborhood pump in Broad Street. Everyone breathed the same air, but only some people used that particular pump and only its users got sick. He deduced that germ-contaminated water was the source of all the cholera cases. Snow's maps were a powerful confirmation of the germ theory of disease, and explained how the germs spread. Doctors could now discard the old airborne "Miasma theory".

Snow's great discovery decisively influenced public health policies and quickly led to the construction of improved sanitation facilities. The term "focus of infection" started to be used to describe sites, such as one particular water pump in Broad Street that spread the cholera germs.

==== London sewers ====
Sir Joseph Bazalgette was the Chief Engineer of London's Metropolitan Board of Works, 1856–1889. His major achievement was the creation of a sewerage system for central London, in response to the Great Stink of 1858. His solution in 1864–1875 was to construct a network of 82 miles (132 km) of enclosed underground brick main sewers to intercept sewage outflows, and 1,100 miles (1,800 km) of street sewers, to divert the raw sewage which flowed freely through the streets and thoroughfares of London to the river. His system proved instrumental in relieving the city of cholera epidemics, while beginning to clean the River Thames.

=== Impact of sanitation ===
Historians have been using quantitative models to estimate the impact of investment in sanitation and pure water supplies on health indicators. One study of 16 cities outside London indicates that for 1845–1884, the first round of sanitation investments were associated with sharp declines in infant and child mortality, and a 13% decline in overall mortality. However subsequent rounds of spending in the same cities gave a much smaller decline.

=== Housing and public health in the Victorian era ===
19th-century Britain saw a huge population increase accompanied by rapid urbanisation stimulated by the Industrial Revolution. In the 1901 census, more than three out of every four people were classified as living in an urban area, compared to one in five a century earlier. Historian Richard A. Soloway wrote that "Great Britain had become the most urbanized country in the West." The rapid growth in the urban population included the new industrial and manufacturing cities, as well as service centres such as Edinburgh and London. Private renting from housing landlords was the dominant tenure. P. Kemp says this was usually of advantage to tenants. Overcrowding was a major problem with seven or eight people frequently sleeping in a single room. Until at least the 1880s, sanitation was inadequate in areas such as water supply and disposal of sewage. This all had a negative effect on health, especially that of the impoverished young. For instance, of the babies born in Liverpool in 1851, only 45 per cent survived to age 20. Conditions were particularly bad in London, where the population rose sharply and poorly maintained, overcrowded dwellings became slum housing. Kellow Chesney wrote of the situation:

Hideous slums, some of them acres wide, some no more than crannies of obscure misery, make up a substantial part of the metropolis... In big, once handsome houses, thirty or more people of all ages may inhabit a single room

Hunger and poor diet was a common aspect of life across the UK in the Victorian period, especially in the 1840s, but the mass starvation seen in the Great Famine in Ireland was unique. Levels of poverty fell significantly during the 19th century from as much as two thirds of the population in 1800 to less than a third by 1901. However, 1890s studies suggested that almost 10% of the urban population lived in a state of desperation lacking the food necessary to maintain basic physical functions. Attitudes towards the poor were often unsympathetic and they were frequently blamed for their situation. In that spirit, the Poor Law Amendment Act 1834 had been deliberately designed to punish them and would remain the basis for welfare provision into the 20th century. While many people were prone to vices, not least alcoholism, historian Bernard A. Cook argues that the main reason for 19th century poverty was that typical wages for much of the population were simply too low. Barely enough to provide a subsistence living in good times, let alone save up for bad.

Improvements were made over time to housing along with the management of sewage and water, eventually giving the UK the most advanced system of public health protection anywhere in the world. The quality and safety of household lighting improved over the period with oil lamps becoming the norm in the early 1860s, gas lighting in the 1890s and electric lights beginning to appear in the homes of the richest by the end of the period. Medicine advanced rapidly during the 19th century and germ theory was developed for the first time. Doctors became more specialised and the number of hospitals grew. The overall number of deaths fell by about 20%. The life expectancy of women increased from around 42 to 55 and 40 to 56 for men. Very rapid urbanisation aided the spread of diseases, and squalid living conditions in many places exacerbated the problem. The population of England, Scotland and Wales grew rapidly during the 19th century. Various factors are considered contributary to this, such as the lack of a catastrophic pandemic or famine for the first time in history, improved nutrition, and a lower overall mortality rate. Ireland's population shrank significantly, mostly due to emigration and the Great Famine.

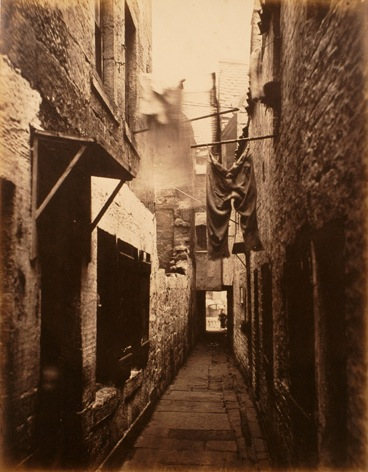
Slum area in Glasgow (1871)

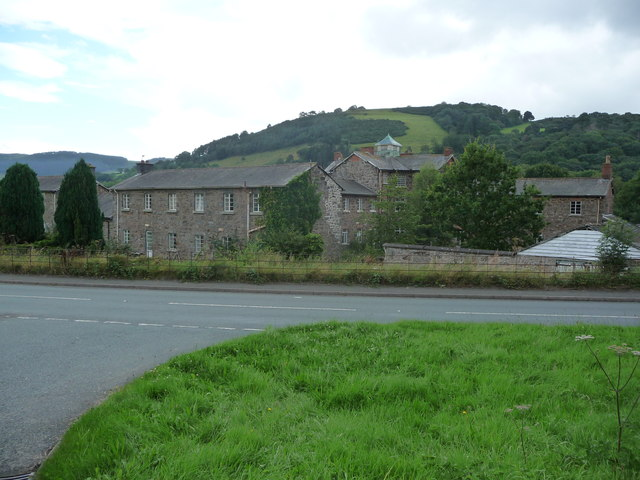
Buildings originally built as Llanfyllin workhouse, a state-funded home for the destitute which operated from 1838 to 1930

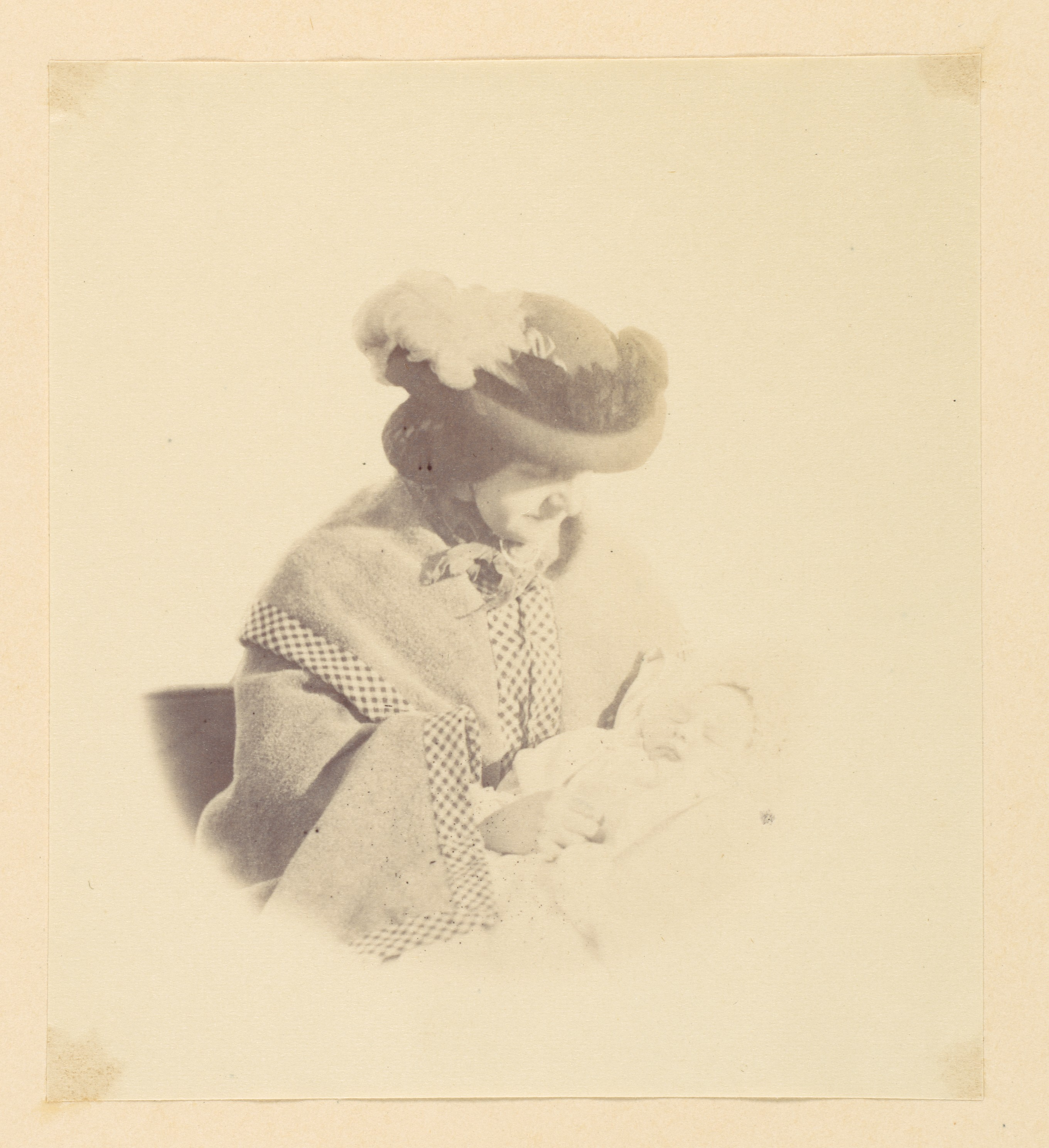
Photograph of a mother and baby by Alfred Capel-Cure (c. 1850s or 60s)

=== Improved health ===
Mortality declined steadily in urban England and Wales 1870–1917. Robert Millward and Frances N. Bell looked statistically at those factors in the physical environment (especially population density and overcrowding) that raised death rates directly, as well as indirect factors such as price and income movements that affected expenditures on sewers, water supplies, food, and medical staff. The statistical data show that increases in the incomes of households and increases in town tax revenues helped cause the decline of mortality.

The new money permitted higher spending on food, and also on a wide range of health-enhancing goods and services such as medical care. The major improvement in the physical environment was the quality of the housing stock, which rose faster than the population; its quality was increasingly regulated by central and local government. Infant mortality fell faster in England and Wales than in Scotland. Clive Lee argues that one factor was the continued overcrowding in Scotland's housing. During the First World War, infant mortality fell sharply across the country. J. M. Winter attributes this to the full employment and higher wages paid to war workers. In 1901-1910, infant mortality became a focus of public health concerns, with more detailed reporting and analysis. The Midwives Act 1902 regulated midwifery, in order to ensure safer childbirth practices.

== Hospitals ==
In 1800 hospitals were few in number, and played a small role in public health. Their primary role was to provide free service to the poor. During the 19th century, the number and variety of hospitals grew dramatically. In the long run, the most important were the voluntary hospitals. By 1900, they had become the elite institutions for the practice of the best medicine, using a new and much deeper understanding of disease based on the theory of germs.

=== Types of hospitals ===
Britain had a great variety of hospitals in the 19th century.

- Voluntary hospitals: There were around 1,000 voluntary hospitals, compared with the 3,000 or so public hospitals in the other categories. The voluntary hospitals were funded by fees and by charitable donations. They were managed by private organizations led by the local upper class. Although they provided some free or low-cost medical care to the poor, their emphasis was on the paying middle class family. They played a steadily expanding role as they came to dominate the healthcare system.
- Cottage hospital: These were small hospitals, typically accommodating around 12 patients. They were established in rural areas and were often run by local general practitioners (GPs). Cottage hospitals provided basic medical care and were more accessible to people living in the countryside.
- Infirmaries: Larger hospitals located in towns and cities, the infirmaries provided both inpatient and outpatient services. An example is Leeds General Infirmary. Initially funded by charities, these hospitals were often crowded and had poor sanitary conditions. They played a central role in providing medical care to the urban population.
- Specialist hospitals: These hospitals focused on specific medical conditions or patient groups. For example, the Hospital for Sick Children, established in 1852, was dedicated to pediatric care. Likewise others emerged from new specialties including fever hospitals; maternity hospitals; and incurable hospitals.
- Workhouse infirmaries: These were part of the notorious workhouse system and provided medical care to the poor and destitute. Conditions in workhouse infirmaries were often harsh, and the quality of care varied widely. They were intended to be a last resort for those who had no other means of support. Public outrage spurred reforms, including the Metropolitan Poor Act 1867, which mandated separate infirmaries for London’s sick poor. By the 1880s, many workhouses evolved into dedicated hospitals with trained nurses. Nevertheless, the negative reputation persisted well into the 20th century.
- Military and naval hospitals: Established near military bases or in strategic locations to care for military and naval personnel.
- Neighborhood dispensaries were established in many cities that provided outpatient care for the poor. An example is the Preventive Medical Institute of Bristol. They mostly closed by the early 20th century.

=== The crisis of war ===
The different hospital types were all uncoordinated because they were run by scores of local and regional government authorities, all of them very narrowly focused. The confusion ended suddenly in 1939 when the government realized war was near and Germany had a superior air force that could bomb all British cities. Officials feared they would have vast numbers of civilian casualties needing medical care. One prediction made in 1937 warned German bombing would cause 600,000 civilian deaths and 1,200,000 in need of medical attention. By 1945 there were in fact 61,000 deaths and 86,000 seriously wounded.

All the hospitals were put under the direction of the new Emergency Hospital Service. Civil defense was urgent, so backward facilities were quickly upgraded and a wide range of new programs were started. By 1944 authorities were pleased and surprised to discover that a unified, coordinated system was possible. Indeed, it now existed, it worked well, and it won widespread support from the public and from all interested parties. The stage was set for a post war radical reconstruction of national health services.

=== Funding ===
In the 18th century the voluntary hospital movement began to provide inpatient care thanks to philanthropic efforts. Donations from wealthy benefactors provided free care to the "deserving poor". In London, hospitals like St Bartholomew's Hospital and Guy's Hospital initially served as refuges for the indigent, operating under a paternalistic model where trustees—drawn from the local elite—oversaw governance. Patients who could afford it avoided them. Instead they used small facilities operated by their physician.

Throughout the 19th century, as urban populations soared, rising operational costs and increasing patient demand increasingly strained local charitable funds. Local government started public hospitals in the major cities. For instance, outpatient admissions at Royal London Hospital surged from 900 in 1809 to over 150,000 by 1895, reflecting broader societal reliance on institutional care. Some physicians and surgeons operated very small hospitals for their own paying patients. The needs for hospitals changed according to the needs of physicians and local governments, and the sharp decline of epidemics and communicable diseases. Financial pressures, social stratification, and evolving governance models likewise helped to reshape how medical care was delivered to the public in the 19th century.

== Since 1900 ==
=== Contributory schemes ===
From the late 19th century to 1948 door-to-door solicitors signed up employed men to hospital contributory schemes which acted like insurance. They collected small weekly payments from members who in turn received free treatment from the participating hospital. Most prominent was the Hospital Saturday Fund (founded 1873). These schemes, which by the 1930s enrolled over 10 million contributors nationally, allowed voluntary hospitals to offset costs while providing a guaranteed flow of patients. In cities like Birmingham and Liverpool, the Hospital Saving Association (HSA) funded up to 59% of voluntary hospital beds by 1948. These programs had support from labour unions, which previously had run their own schemes.

A representative program was the Tredegar Medical Aid Society in South Wales. There coal miner Aneurin Bevan joined and was pleased with the service it provided. When Bevan became Minister of Health in the Labour government of 1945, he used Tredegar as part of the model for the National Health Service that he created.

After 1948 all hospitals were nationalized and became components of the free National Health Service. Hospitals were microcosms of broader social struggles over the welfare state in Britain. Their transformation from charitable endeavors to public institutions reflects shifting ideologies about poverty, responsibility, and the state’s role in welfare. While contributory schemes demonstrated the potential for working-class participation, they ultimately could not reconcile efficiency with equity—a lesson that informed the NHS’s founding.

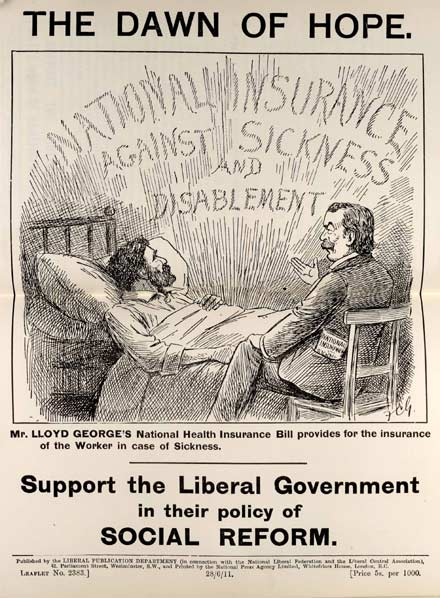
The Liberal Party under David Lloyd George (right) boasts of passing the National Insurance Act 1911.

=== National health insurance, 1911 ===
In Britain, the National Insurance Act 1911 included national social health insurance for medical care for sick, injured or disabled workers. When it went into effect in 1913 it covered one-third of the population—employed working class wage earners. In 1913, it covered 13 million workers using 15,000 doctors. Doctors were paid £.4.3 million. Coverage expanded somewhat steadily and by 1938 it reached 19 million workers; its 19,000 doctors were paid £9.2 million. Only active blue collar workers were covered, and not their families. Income of participating doctors went up steadily until they did almost as well as barristers.

This system of health insurance continued in force until 1948. Then the National Health Service created a universal service, funded out of general taxation rather than on an insurance basis, and providing health services to all legal residents.

=== Nursing ===
The number of nurses rose rapidly in the 20th century. According to the 1901 United Kingdom census, there were 64,000 women nurses, along with 5,000 men. Of the total, 12,500 were trained or registered. By 1921 there were 110,000 women and 12,000 men in nursing, 25,000 were trained or registered. By 1939 there were 160,000 nurses in all, of whom 60,000 were trained and registered.

=== Infant mortality ===
The 20th century witnessed further declines in infant mortality:

- 1993: The infant mortality rate in England was 6.3 deaths per 1,000 live births.
- The current infant mortality rate for the UK in 2025 is 3.2 deaths per 1000 live births, and the rate is declining at about 2% a year.

==== Factors in decline ====
Historians emphasise that progress was not always linear. For example, there were periods of stagnation and even slight increases in infant mortality rates, particularly in urban areas during rapid industrialisation. Multiple factors contributed to the overall decline in infant mortality:

- Advancets [sic?] in citywide sanitation and public health measures.
- Improvements in infant care, particularly in antenatal and neonatal care.
- Changes in breastfeeding practices and infant feeding methods.

=== Role of philanthropy ===
In the 1920s government public health funding concentrated on upgrading public infrastructure and helping wounded war veterans. Meanwhile, a number of private philanthropies took roles in public health. They were not funded by the government and ranged from major international operations such as the Rockefeller Foundation, to membership groups like the Order of Saint John, to small local charities. Rockefeller sponsored training programs for visiting nurses. The others focused on individual needs at the neighborhood level, such as helping poor families with childbirth and child welfare and dealing with tuberculosis, or providing ambulance services to hospitals for victims of traffic accidents.

== National Health Service since 1948 ==
Since 1948, the great majority of health services have been an integral part of the National Health Service . It provides free medical care, even as heavy use causes longer and longer delays.

== See also ==
- Health in the United Kingdom
  - Health in England
  - Health in Wales
  - Health in Scotland
  - Health in Northern Ireland
- UK Health Security Agency
- Healthcare in the United Kingdom
  - Private healthcare in the United Kingdom
  - British Society for the History of Medicine
- History of the National Health Service, since 1948
- History of nursing in the United Kingdom
- Suicide in the United Kingdom
- Water supply and sanitation in the United Kingdom

=== People ===
- Edward Jenner 1749–1823 , first vaccine
- Edwin Chadwick, 1800–1890
- William Henry Duncan (1805–1863), activist in Liverpool; the first Medical Officer of Health
- John Snow, 1813–1858
- John Simon (pathologist), 1816–1904
- Joseph Bazalgette, 1819–1891, built the sewerage system for London
- Florence Nightingale, 1820–1910, founded modern nursing
- Arthur Newsholme, 1857–1943, local projects
- Aneurin Bevan, 1897–1960, designed the National Health Service in 1940s
- Brian Abel-Smith, 1926–1996, developed the economics of public health
