= Report on The Sanitary Condition of the Labouring Population of Great Britain =

1842 research paper on England's working class

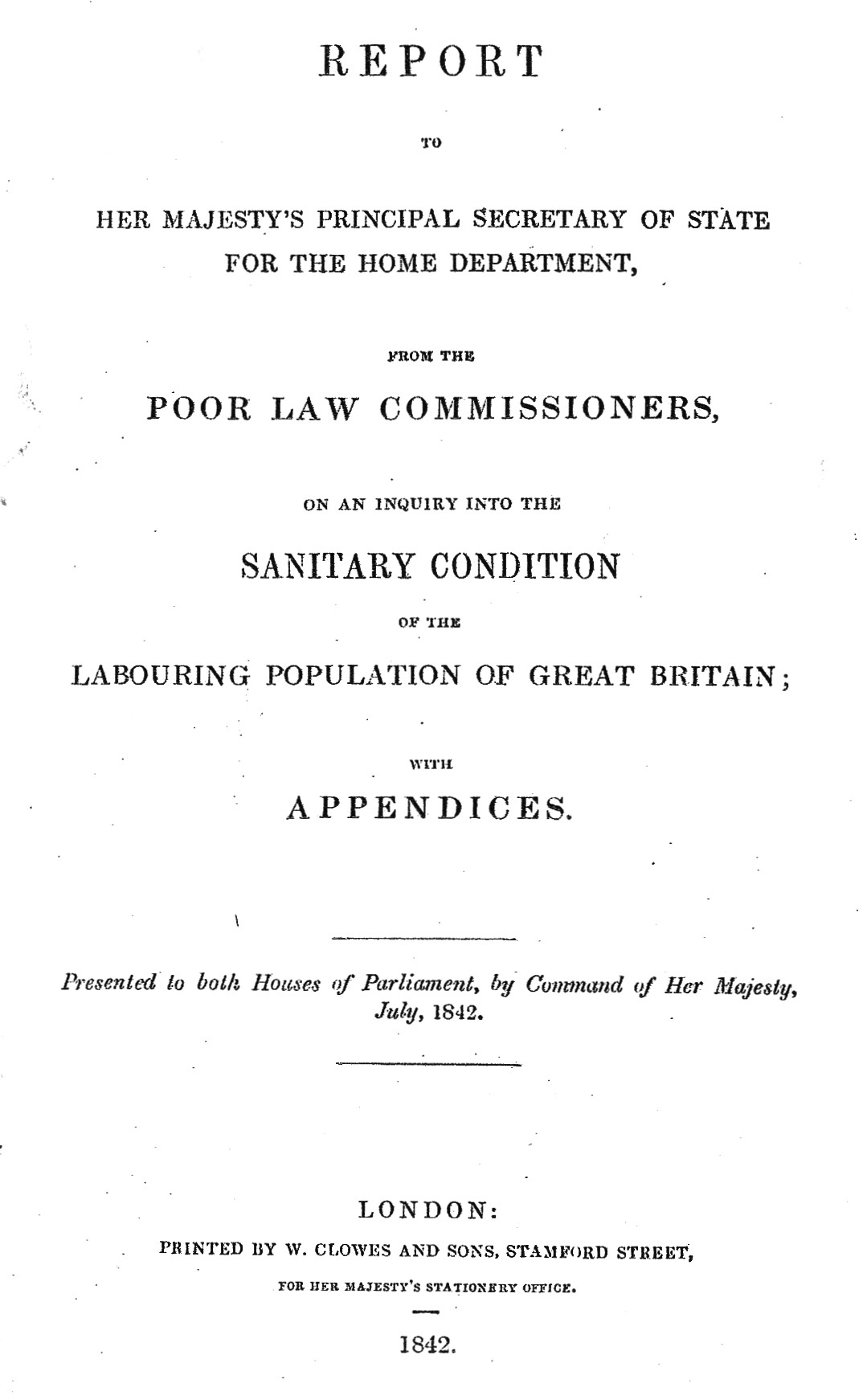
- Title page of Chadwick's report
- Author: Edwin Chadwick, Nassau William Senior
- Genre: Public Health, social history, political economy
- Publisher: W. Clowes and Sons, Her Majesty's Stationery Office
- Publication date: 1842
- Pages: 443–452
- Followed by: Report on the Sanitary Condition of the Labouring Population of Great Britain. A Supplementary Report on the results of a Special Inquiry into The Practice of Interment in Towns

The Report on The Sanitary Condition of the Labouring Population of Great Britain is a research report into England's working class population conducted by English reformer Edwin Chadwick and English economist Nassau William Senior. Initially requested by the Poor Law Commission, its research began in 1839 and was published in 1842.

== Research ==
Initial research began in 1839, focused on London, requested by the Poor Law Commission. Chadwick employed surveyor John Roe who would investigate the districts of Holborn and Finsbury and to research methods on which is the most effective way to transport sewerage and water.

After beginning the research, Home Secretary Sir James Graham, prompted by the House of Lords, asked Chadwick in 1839 and his research team to also include information on disease among the working class throughout Britain, rather than just London.

Upon completion, the report was submitted to the Parliament of England in 1842 in a parliamentary session and published in July under his own name and at his own expense.

== Content ==
The report was compiled into three volumes: two volumes of local reports from across the whole of Britain, which were based on questionnaires and sent out to local boards of guardians, and a third volume describing Chadwick's own conclusions on his research and recommendations to Parliament.

=== Population and sanitation ===
Chadwick gathered information on the average age people would die in certain regions of London. He concluded that, alongside three doctors, the cost of pauperism would be higher to maintain for factory owners and the government in London than if they were to prioritise the improvements of sanitary conditions. He discovered that professionals would die at an average age of 38–52, tradesmen at 22–41, and labourers at 15–38; however, regions with poorer sanitation meant that rich professionals would die younger in those regions than ones with better sanitation, the same going for the other two classes. He then concluded for larger investment in sanitation.

=== Underground sewerage and piping ===
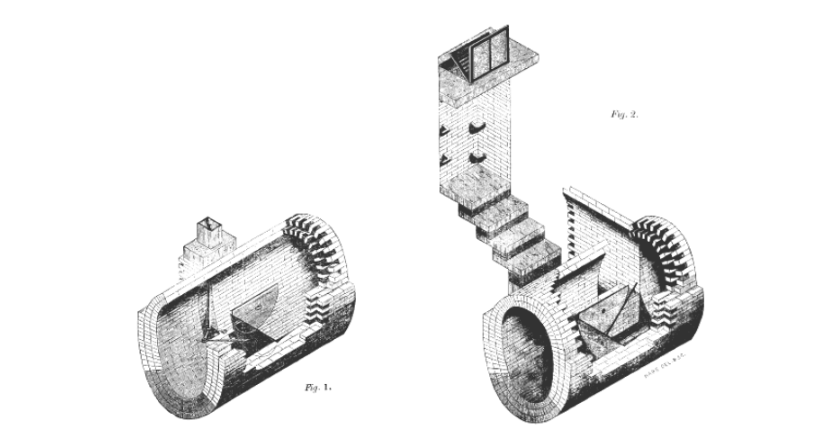
The first flushing gates were designed by John Roe in 1842.

John Roe suggested that the regions of Holborn and Finsbury should implement flushing gates, something that had been invented by Roe whilst conducting research on the sewerage systems in the area. These designs were then used across London and internationally by individuals like William Lindley in Hamburg, Germany, citing Roe's invention in his report. Additionally, another unnamed individual from France implemented Roe's sewerage designs in Paris.

=== Water supplies and filtration ===
Evidence provided by physician Dr Dyce Guthrie influenced Chadwick to recommend that every house should contain a permanent water supply, rather than obtaining water from standpipes which were often used publicly and, unknowingly to the individuals at the time, caused disease like cholera. Consequently, Chadwick strongly criticised the inadequacy of existing public water supplies, drainage, and sewerage systems in London. He also criticised private water companies for providing clean water only to the middle- and upper-classes of London; however, Chadwick also criticised how these companies weren't cleaning the water correctly, even for the affluent civilians of London, therefore, he suggested less people be in charge of the private water companies and to improve their filtration.

== Reception ==
The report was treated with negative reactions from across England, but some considered it to be the beginning of a new reformist movement for England's poor and working classes.

Sir James Graham was reluctant to implement the findings and recommendations in Parliament. In the end, he established the Royal Commission on the Health of Towns in 1843/44.

The report, combined with Chadwick writing letters often to the government and Poor Law Commission urging for significant change, led to the eventual creation of the Public Health Act 1848 (a permissive act, yet, it was a step in attempting to tackle the sanitary conditions of towns and cities in England), where its main aims were to tackle drainage, sewerage, and street paving. This also led to the creation of a local board of health, catalysed by the cholera epidemics, notably the 1826–1837 cholera pandemic, which attempted to implement the reforms of the act and report's recommendations. Chadwick was appointed commissioner.

== Supplementary Report ==
A supplementary report was also published in 1843, titled the "Report on the Sanitary Condition of the Labouring Population of Great Britain. A Supplementary Report on the results of a Special Inquiry into The Practice of Interment in Towns". In this report, he reviewed burial conditions, reported on the conditions of poor families, the impact of limited funds due to dead relatives, and overcrowded living spaces. He noted that families often spent too much money on funerals, regarding this as wasteful.

== See also ==
- History of public health in the United Kingdom
