= Health in England =

Health in England refers to the overall health of the population of England. Despite overall increases in life expectancy in England, the most deprived areas continue to see no change or a decrease in life expectancy. The Blair Government instituted a comprehensive programme to reduce health inequalities in England between 1997 and 2010 focused on reducing geographical inequalities in life expectancy. It was targeted at the Spearhead areas - the 20% of local authorities with the worst health and deprivation indicators. This led to more NHS resources being directed to the most deprived areas. The strategy was associated with a decline in geographical inequalities in life expectancy, reversing a trend which had increased over a long period. However, health inequalities still remain. In 2014 to 2016, the difference in life expectancy between the most and least deprived areas of England was 9.3 years for males and 7.3 years for females.

== Life expectancy ==
A North-South divide in life expectancy continues to be apparent. In 2016 to 2018, this geographical divide can be seen across regions of England. The life expectancy at birth of males and females in the regions of London, the South East, South West and East of England were all significantly higher than the national average. Whereas, life expectancy was lowest in the North East, North West and Yorkshire and the Humber.

Regions of England

On average, there have been reductions in the number of years lived in poorer states of health for both men and women at age 65 in England. As of 2018, Richmond-upon-Thames had the highest male healthy life expectancy at birth in the UK of 71.9 years, 18.6 years longer than males in Blackpool where it was only 53.3 years. For females, the lowest healthy life expectancy at birth was found in Nottingham at 54.2 years, and the highest was in Wokingham at 72.2 years, a gap of 18 years.

Life expectancy in the regions of England, 2016–2018
	Male	Female
England	79.6	83.2
North East	77.9	81.7
North West	78.3	81.9
Yorkshire and the Humber	78.7	82.4
East Midlands	79.4	82.9
West Midlands	78.9	82.7
East	80.3	83.7
London	80.7	84.5
South East	80.7	84.1
South West	80.2	83.8

The ten leading causes of death for men in England are heart disease, dementia and Alzheimer's disease, lung cancer, chronic lower respiratory diseases, stroke, influenza and pneumonia, prostate cancer, colorectal cancer, leukemia and diseases of the liver, respectively. In females, the leading cause of death is dementia and Alzheimer's disease followed by heart disease, stroke, chronic lower respiratory diseases, influenza and pneumonia, lung cancer, breast cancer, colorectal cancer, leukemia and kidney disease. Higher mortality rates for heart disease, lung cancer, and chronic lower respiratory diseases in the most deprived areas contribute the most to the life expectancy gap. Smoking and obesity are the main risk factors for these diseases.

People in the most deprived areas are more than twice as likely to die prematurely from cancer, and there has been no significant change in this level of inequality since 2010 to 2012. Similarly, people in the most deprived areas are almost four times as likely to die prematurely from cardiovascular disease compared with those in the least deprived areas, and this inequality has also significantly widened since 2010 to 2012.

== Risk factors ==
A study by Public Health England in 2017 found that 41% of the 15.3 million English adults aged 40 to 60 do not walk for as much as 10 minutes continuously each month at a brisk pace. A quarter of the English population was found to be "inactive" – doing less than 30 minutes of activity per week.

The heaviest-drinking 20% of the population drink almost two thirds of all alcohol consumed.

Figures published by the Office for National Statistics (ONS) in April 2024, showed that the suicide rate in England had risen by 6% since 2022.

== See also ==
- History of public health in the United Kingdom
- National Health Service (England)
- Healthcare in England
- Health in the United Kingdom
- Health in Wales
- Health in Scotland
- Health in Northern Ireland
- Category:Drugs in England
- Category:Mental health in England
