= Secretary of State for Health and Social Care =

Member of the Cabinet of the United Kingdom

- Royal Arms of His Majesty's Government

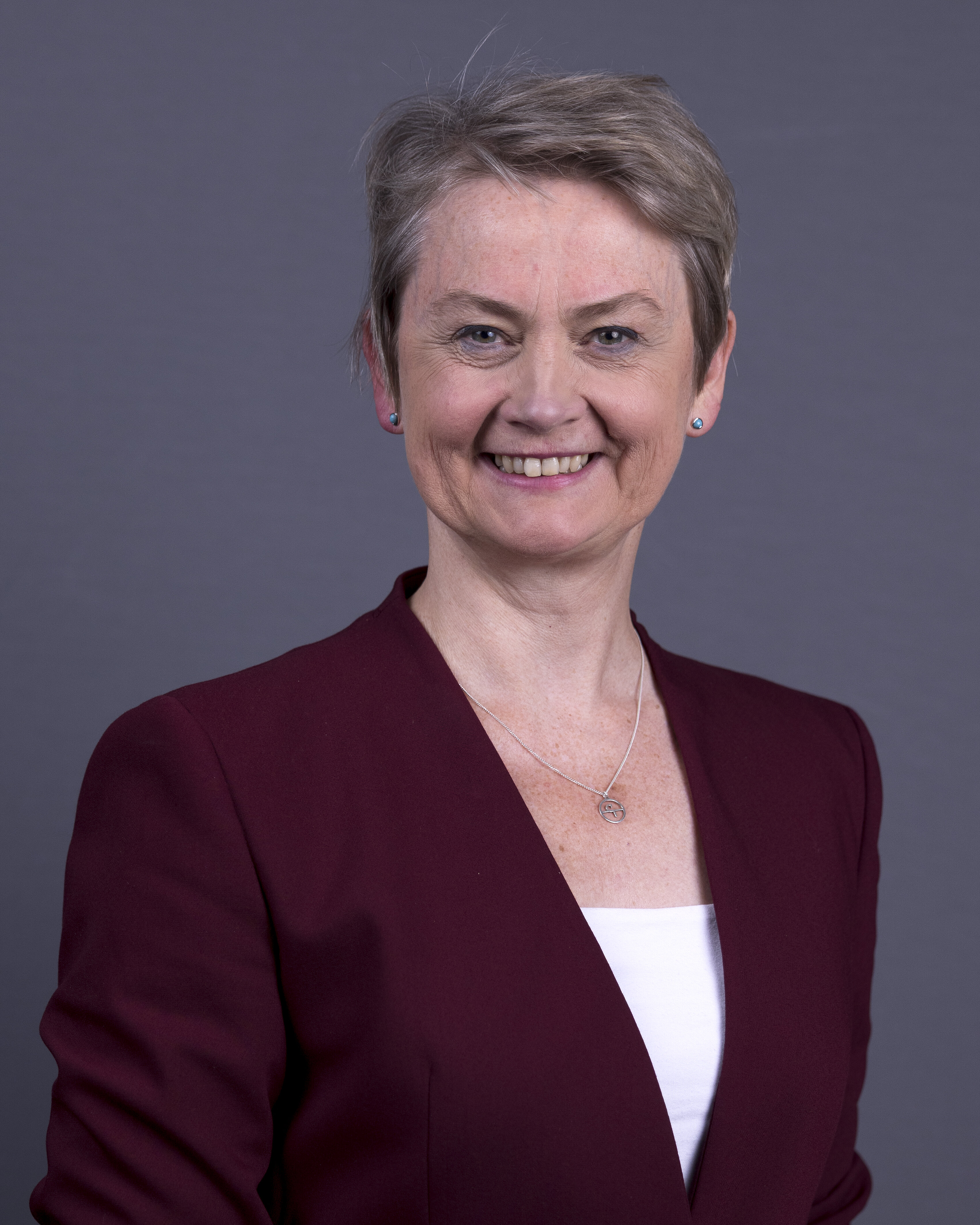
- Incumbent; Yvette Cooper since 20 July 2026
- Department of Health and Social Care (England)
- Style: Health Secretary (informal); The Right Honourable (within the UK and Commonwealth); His/Her excellency (diplomatic)
- Type: Minister of the Crown
- Status: Secretary of State
- Member of: Cabinet; Privy Council
- Reports to: The Prime Minister
- Seat: Westminster
- Nominator: The Prime Minister
- Appointer: The Monarch; (on the advice of the Prime Minister)
- Term length: At His Majesty's pleasure
- Formation: 14 October 1854: (as President of the Board of Health); 8 January 2018: (as Secretary of State for Health and Social Care)
- First holder: Benjamin Hall (as President of the Board of Health)
- Salary: £159,038 per annum (2022) (including £86,584 MP salary)
- Website: gov.uk/government/ministers/secretary-of-state-for-health-and-social-care

- Applies to: England (mostly)
- Relates to: Health and social care

Other UK counterparts
- Northern Ireland: Minister of Health
- Scotland: Cabinet Secretary for Health and Social Care (Scotland)
- Wales: Cabinet Secretary for Health and Social Care (Wales)

The secretary of state for health and social care, also referred to as the health secretary, is a secretary of state in the Government of the United Kingdom, responsible for the work of the Department of Health and Social Care, mainly overseeing health and social care in England. The incumbent is a member of the Cabinet of the United Kingdom.

Since devolution in 1999, the position holder's responsibility for the NHS is mainly restricted to the health service in England, whilst the Cabinet Secretary for Health and Social Care in the Scottish Government is responsible for NHS Scotland and the Cabinet Secretary for Health and Social Care in the Welsh Government is responsible for NHS Wales. The position can trace its roots back to the nineteenth century, and has been a secretary of state position since 1968. For 30 years, from 1988 to 2018, the position was titled Secretary of State for Health, before Prime Minister Theresa May added "and Social Care" to the designation in the 2018 British cabinet reshuffle.

The officeholder works alongside other health and social care ministers. The corresponding shadow minister is the shadow secretary of state for health and social care, and the secretary of state is also scrutinised by the Health and Social Care Select Committee.

The position is currently held by Yvette Cooper, who has served since 20 July 2026.

== Responsibilities ==
Corresponding to what is generally known as a health minister in many other countries, the health and social care secretary's remit includes the following:

- oversight of England's National Health Service, including:
  - delivery of care
  - performance
  - fiscal consolidation
  - financial management
- matters concerning England's social care policy (although responsibility is shared with the Ministry of Housing, Communities and Local Government regarding adult social care, and with the Department for Education concerning children's social care).
- matters concerning England's national public health.
- relations with international health partnerships, including the WHO.

Some functions are derived from legislation, for example when the position of Secretary of State for Health was established in 1988, specific functions were allocated to the post-holder drawn from the Births and Deaths Registration Act 1926, the Therapeutic Substances Act 1956, the Professions Supplementary to Medicine Act 1960(26), the National Health Service Act 1966, the Radiological Protection Act 1970, the Child Care Act 1980 and the Food Act 1984.

== History ==
The first Boards of Health were created by Orders in the Council dated 21 June, 14 November, and 21 November 1831. In 1848, a General Board of Health was established with lay members in leadership roles and the first commissioner of woods and forests as its president. In 1854, this board was reconstituted, and the president was appointed separately. However, the board was abolished in 1858, and its function of overseeing local boards was transferred to a new Local Government Act Office within the Home Office. From 1871, that function was transferred to the new Local Government Board.

The Ministry of Health was created by the Ministry of Health Act 1919 as a reconstruction of the Local Government Board. Local government functions were eventually transferred to the minister of housing and local government, leaving the Health Ministry in charge of health matters.

From 1968, it was amalgamated with the Ministry of Social Security under the secretary of state for social services, until the de-merger of the Department of Health and Social Security on 25 July 1988.

Since devolution in 1999, the position holder's responsibility for the NHS is mainly restricted to the health service in England, while the holders' counterparts in Scotland and Wales are responsible for the NHS in Scotland and Wales. Prior to devolution, the secretaries of state for Scotland and Wales had those respective responsibilities, but the Department of Health played a larger role than it does now in the coordination of health policy across Great Britain. Health services in Northern Ireland have always had separate arrangements from the rest of the UK and are currently the responsibility of the health minister in the Northern Ireland Executive.

In 2018 the position was incorporated as a corporation sole.

A small number of health issues remain reserved matters, meaning they are not devolved.

According to Jeremy Hunt, the department receives more letters than any other government department, and there are 50 officials in the correspondence unit.

== List of ministers ==
Colour key (for political parties):
Whig Conservative Radical Peelite Liberal Labour Unionist National Labour National Liberal

=== President of the Board of Health (1848–1858) ===
President of the Board	Term of office		Political party	Prime Minister
As First Commissioner of Woods and Forests				Lord John Russell
The Earl of Carlisle	1848	17 April 1849	Whig	Lord John Russell
Lord Seymour; MP for Totnes	17 April 1849	1 August 1851	Whig	Lord John Russell
As First Commissioner of Works				Lord John Russell
Lord Seymour; MP for Totnes	1 August 1851	21 February 1852	Whig	Lord John Russell
Lord John Manners; MP for Colchester	4 March 1852	17 December 1852	Conservative	The Earl of Derby
William Molesworth; MP for Southwark	5 January 1853	14 October 1854	Radical	The Earl of Aberdeen (Coalition)
President of the Board of Health				The Earl of Aberdeen (Coalition)
Benjamin Hall; MP for Marylebone	14 October 1854	13 August 1855	Whig	The Earl of Aberdeen (Coalition)
Benjamin Hall; MP for Marylebone	14 October 1854	13 August 1855	Whig	The Viscount Palmerston
William Cowper; MP for Hertford	13 August 1855	9 February 1857	Whig	The Viscount Palmerston
William Monsell; MP for County Limerick	9 February 1857	24 September 1857	Whig	The Viscount Palmerston
William Cowper; MP for Hertford	24 September 1857	21 February 1858	Whig	The Viscount Palmerston
Charles Adderley; MP for Staffordshire Northern	8 March 1858	1 September 1858	Conservative	The Earl of Derby
Board of Health abolished in 1858; responsibilities transferred to the Privy Council (1858–1871), then the Local Government Board (1871–1919).

=== Minister of Health (1919–1968) ===
Minister	Term of office		Political party	Ministry
Christopher Addison; MP for Shoreditch	24 June 1919	1 April 1921	Liberal	Lloyd George II
Alfred Mond; MP for Swansea West	1 April 1921	19 October 1922	Liberal	Lloyd George II
Arthur Griffith-Boscawen; MP for Taunton	24 October 1922	7 March 1923 (Lost seat 1922)	Conservative	Law
Neville Chamberlain; MP for Birmingham Ladywood	7 March 1923	27 August 1923	Conservative	Law
Neville Chamberlain; MP for Birmingham Ladywood	7 March 1923	27 August 1923	Conservative	Baldwin I
William Joynson-Hicks; MP for Twickenham	27 August 1923	22 January 1924	Conservative	Baldwin I
John Wheatley; MP for Glasgow Shettleston	22 January 1924	3 November 1924	Labour	MacDonald I
Neville Chamberlain; MP for Birmingham Ladywood then Birmingham Edgbaston	6 November 1924	4 June 1929	Conservative	Baldwin II
Arthur Greenwood; MP for Nelson and Colne	7 June 1929	24 August 1931	Labour	Macdonald II
Neville Chamberlain; MP for Birmingham Edgbaston	25 August 1931	5 November 1931	Conservative	National I
Hilton Young; MP for Sevenoaks	5 November 1931	7 June 1935	Conservative	National II
Kingsley Wood; MP for Woolwich West	7 June 1935	16 May 1938	Conservative	National III
Kingsley Wood; MP for Woolwich West	7 June 1935	16 May 1938	Conservative	National IV
Walter Elliot; MP for Glasgow Kelvingrove	16 May 1938	13 May 1940	Unionist	National IV
Walter Elliot; MP for Glasgow Kelvingrove	16 May 1938	13 May 1940	Unionist	Chamberlain War
Malcolm MacDonald; MP for Ross and Cromarty	13 May 1940	8 February 1941	National Labour	Churchill War
Ernest Brown; MP for Leith	8 February 1941	11 November 1943	National Liberal	Churchill War
Henry Willink; MP for Croydon North	11 November 1943	26 July 1945	Conservative	Churchill War
Henry Willink; MP for Croydon North	11 November 1943	26 July 1945	Conservative	Churchill Caretaker
Aneurin Bevan; MP for Ebbw Vale	3 August 1945	17 January 1951	Labour	Attlee I
Aneurin Bevan; MP for Ebbw Vale	3 August 1945	17 January 1951	Labour	Attlee II
Hilary Marquand; MP for Middlesbrough East	17 January 1951	26 October 1951	Labour	Attlee II
Harry Crookshank; MP for Gainsborough	30 October 1951	7 May 1952	Conservative	Churchill III
Iain Macleod; MP for Enfield West	7 May 1952	20 December 1955	Conservative	Churchill III
Iain Macleod; MP for Enfield West	7 May 1952	20 December 1955	Conservative	Eden
Robin Turton; MP for Thirsk and Malton	20 December 1955	16 January 1957	Conservative	Eden
Dennis Vosper; MP for Runcorn	16 January 1957	17 September 1957	Conservative	Macmillan I
Derek Walker-Smith; MP for East Hertfordshire	17 September 1957	27 July 1960	Conservative	Macmillan I
Derek Walker-Smith; MP for East Hertfordshire	17 September 1957	27 July 1960	Conservative	Macmillan II
Enoch Powell; MP for Wolverhampton South West	27 July 1960	20 October 1963	Conservative	Macmillan II
Anthony Barber; MP for Doncaster then Altrincham and Sale	20 October 1963	16 October 1964	Conservative	Douglas-Home
Kenneth Robinson; MP for St. Pancras North	18 October 1964	1 November 1968	Labour	Wilson I
Post merged with Ministry for Social Security in 1968.

=== Secretary of State for Social Services (1968–1988) ===
Secretary of State	Term of office		Political party	Ministry
Richard Crossman; MP for Coventry East	1 November 1968	19 June 1970	Labour	Wilson II
Keith Joseph; MP for Leeds North East	20 June 1970	4 March 1974	Conservative	Heath
Barbara Castle; MP for Blackburn	5 March 1974	8 April 1976	Labour	Wilson III
David Ennals; MP for Norwich North	8 April 1976	4 May 1979	Labour	Callaghan
Patrick Jenkin; MP for Wanstead and Woodford	5 May 1979	14 September 1981	Conservative	Thatcher I
Norman Fowler; MP for Sutton Coldfield	14 September 1981	13 June 1987	Conservative	Thatcher I
Norman Fowler; MP for Sutton Coldfield	14 September 1981	13 June 1987	Conservative	Thatcher II
John Moore; MP for Croydon Central	13 June 1987	25 July 1988	Conservative	Thatcher III
Post split into Secretary of State for Social Security and Secretary of State for Health in 1988.

=== Secretary of State for Health (1988–2018) ===
Secretary of State	Term of office		Political party	Ministry
Kenneth Clarke; MP for Rushcliffe	25 July 1988	2 November 1990	Conservative	Thatcher III
William Waldegrave; MP for Bristol West	2 November 1990	10 April 1992	Conservative	Thatcher III
William Waldegrave; MP for Bristol West	2 November 1990	10 April 1992	Conservative	Major I
Virginia Bottomley; MP for South West Surrey	10 April 1992	5 July 1995	Conservative	Major II
Stephen Dorrell; MP for Loughborough then Charnwood	5 July 1995	2 May 1997	Conservative	Major II
Frank Dobson; MP for Holborn and St. Pancras	3 May 1997	11 October 1999	Labour	Blair I
Alan Milburn; MP for Darlington	11 October 1999	13 June 2003	Labour	Blair I
Alan Milburn; MP for Darlington	11 October 1999	13 June 2003	Labour	Blair II
John Reid; MP for Hamilton North and Bellshill then Airdrie and Shotts	13 June 2003	6 May 2005	Labour	Blair II
Patricia Hewitt; MP for Leicester West	6 May 2005	28 June 2007	Labour	Blair III
Alan Johnson; MP for Kingston upon Hull West and Hessle	28 June 2007	5 June 2009	Labour	Brown
Andy Burnham; MP for Leigh	5 June 2009	11 May 2010	Labour	Brown
Andrew Lansley; MP for South Cambridgeshire	11 May 2010	4 September 2012	Conservative	Cameron–Clegg (Con.–L.D.)
Jeremy Hunt; MP for South West Surrey; Tenure	4 September 2012	8 January 2018	Conservative	Cameron–Clegg (Con.–L.D.)
Jeremy Hunt; MP for South West Surrey; Tenure	4 September 2012	8 January 2018	Conservative	Cameron II
Jeremy Hunt; MP for South West Surrey; Tenure	4 September 2012	8 January 2018	Conservative	May I
Jeremy Hunt; MP for South West Surrey; Tenure	4 September 2012	8 January 2018	Conservative	May II

=== Secretary of State for Health and Social Care (2018–present) ===
Secretary of State	Term of office		Political party	Ministry
Jeremy Hunt; MP for South West Surrey; Tenure	8 January 2018	9 July 2018	Conservative	May II
Matt Hancock; MP for West Suffolk	9 July 2018	26 June 2021	Conservative	May II
Matt Hancock; MP for West Suffolk	9 July 2018	26 June 2021	Conservative	Johnson I
Matt Hancock; MP for West Suffolk	9 July 2018	26 June 2021	Conservative	Johnson II
Sajid Javid; MP for Bromsgrove	26 June 2021	5 July 2022	Conservative	Johnson II
Steve Barclay; MP for North East Cambridgeshire	5 July 2022	6 September 2022	Conservative	Johnson II
Thérèse Coffey; MP for Suffolk Coastal	6 September 2022	25 October 2022	Conservative	Truss
Steve Barclay; MP for North East Cambridgeshire	25 October 2022	13 November 2023	Conservative	Sunak
Victoria Atkins; MP for Louth and Horncastle	13 November 2023	5 July 2024	Conservative	Sunak
Wes Streeting; MP for Ilford North	5 July 2024	14 May 2026	Labour	Starmer
James Murray; MP for Ealing North	14 May 2026	20 July 2026	Labour	Starmer
Yvette Cooper; MP for Pontefract, Castleford and Knottingley	20 July 2026	Incumbent	Labour	Burnham

== See also ==
- Health and Social Care minister
- Minister of Health
