= Edwin Chadwick =

British social reformer (1800–1890)

Sir Edwin Chadwick KCB
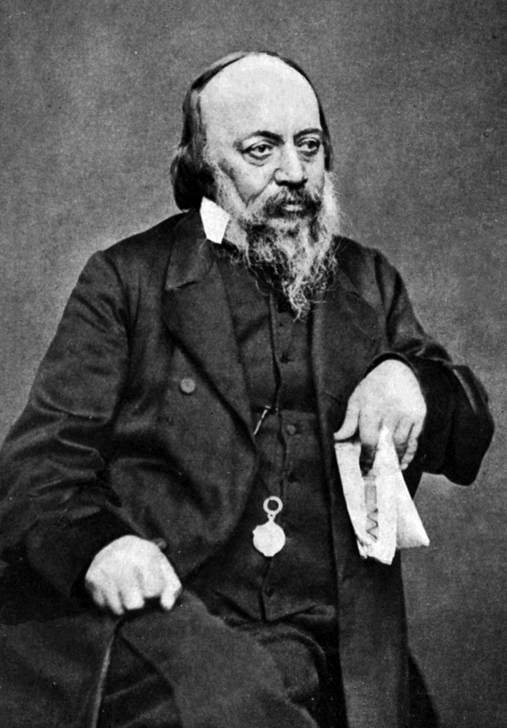
- Sir Edwin Chadwick in c. 1860s
- Born: 24 January 1800; Longsight, Manchester, Lancashire, England
- Died: 6 July 1890 (aged 90); East Sheen, Richmond on Thames, London, England
- Burial place: Mortlake Cemetery
- Occupation: Social reformer
- Known for: Reforming the Poor Laws
- Notable work: Report on The Sanitary Condition of the Labouring Population of Great Britain
- Relatives: Henry Chadwick (half-brother)

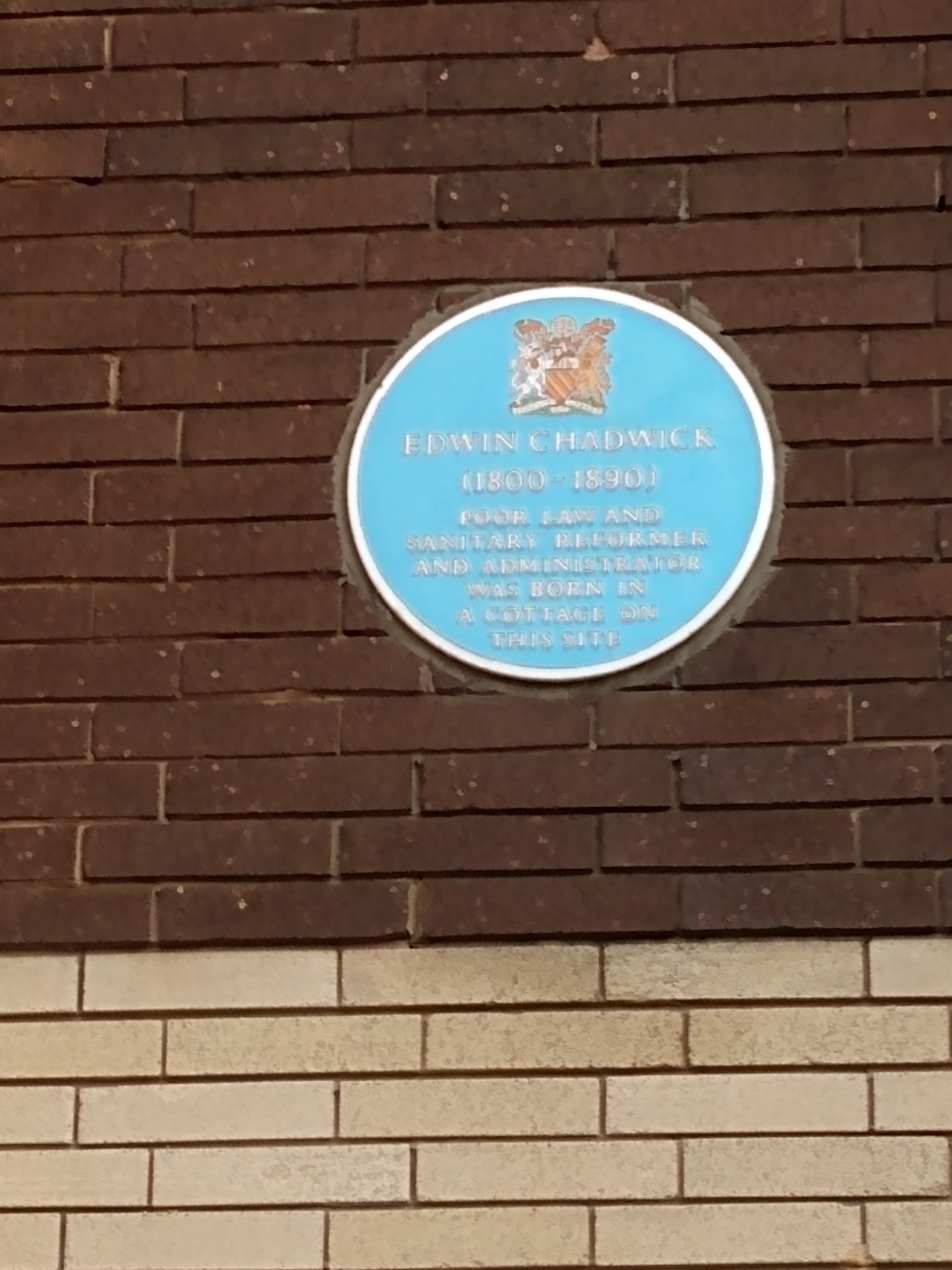
Attached to 5 Kingfisher Close, Longsight and viewed from Stockport Road

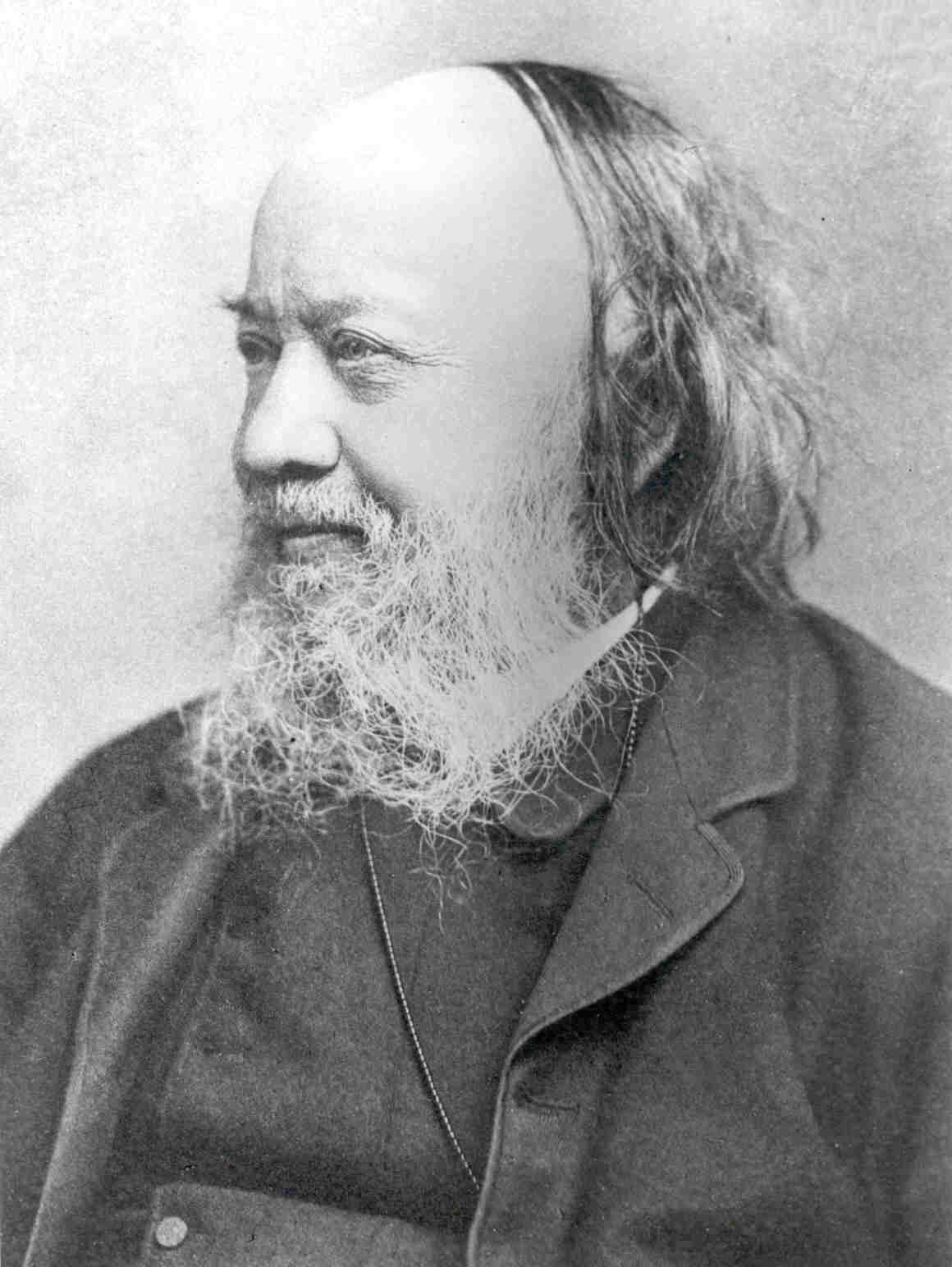
Sir Edwin Chadwick

Sir Edwin Chadwick KCB (24 January 1800 – 6 July 1890) was an English social reformer who is noted for his leadership in reforming the Poor Laws in England and instituting major reforms in urban sanitation and public health. A disciple of Utilitarian philosopher Jeremy Bentham, he was most active between 1832 and 1854; after that he held minor positions, and his views were largely ignored. Chadwick pioneered the use of scientific surveys to identify all phases of a complex social problem, and pioneered the use of systematic long-term inspection programmes to make sure the reforms operated as planned.

== Early life ==
Edwin Chadwick was born on 24 January 1800 at Longsight, Manchester, Lancashire. His mother died when he was still a young child, yet to be named. His father, James Chadwick, tutored the scientist John Dalton in music and botany and was considered to be an advanced liberal politician, thus exposing young Edwin to political and social ideas. His grandfather, Andrew Chadwick, had been a close friend of the Methodist theologian John Wesley.

He began his education at a small local school and then at a boarding school in Stockport, where he studied until he was 10. When his family moved to London in 1810, Chadwick continued his education with the help of private tutors, his father and a great deal of self-teaching.

His father remarried in the early 1820s; Edwin's younger half-brother was baseball icon Henry Chadwick, born in 1824.

At 18, Chadwick decided to pursue a career in law and undertook an apprenticeship with a solicitor. In 1823, he enrolled in law school at The Temple in London. On 26 November 1830, he was called to the bar, becoming a barrister.

Called to the bar without independent means, he sought to support himself by literary work such as his work on 'Applied Science and its Place in Democracy', and his essays in the Westminster Review, mainly on different methods of applying scientific knowledge to the practice of government. He became friends with two of the leading philosophers of the day, John Stuart Mill and Jeremy Bentham. Bentham engaged him as a literary assistant and left him a large legacy. He also became acquainted with Thomas Southwood Smith, Neil Arnott and James Kay-Shuttleworth, all doctors.

From his exposure to social reform and under the influence of his friends, he began to devote his efforts to sanitary reform. In 1832, Chadwick began on his path to make improvements with sanitary and health conditions.

== Reformer ==
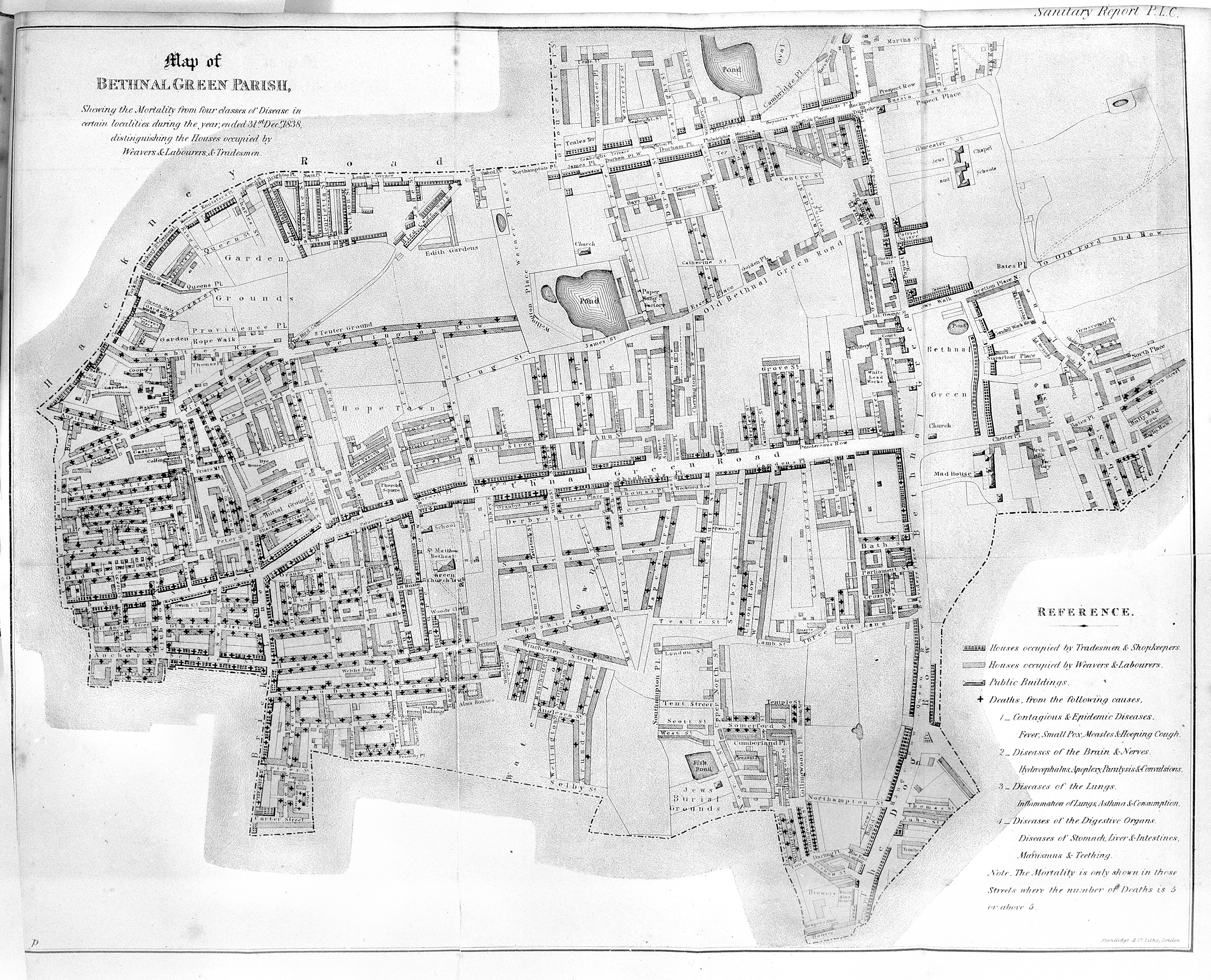
Chadwick's 1838 Bethnal Green parish map showing mortality from four diseases

In 1832, he was employed by the Royal Commission appointed to inquire into the operation of the Poor Law, and in 1833, he was made a full member of that commission. Chadwick and Nassau William Senior drafted the famous report of 1834, recommending the reform of the old law. Under the 1834 system, individual parishes were formed into Poor Law Unions, and each Poor Law Union was to have a union workhouse. Chadwick favoured a more centralised system of administration than the one adopted, and he felt the Poor Law reform of 1834 should have provided for the management of poor law relief by salaried officers controlled from a central board, with the boards of guardians acting merely as inspectors.

In 1834, he was appointed secretary to the Poor Law commissioners. Unwilling to administer an act of which he was largely the author in any way other than as he thought best, he found it hard to get along with his superiors. The disagreement, among others, contributed to the dissolution of the Poor Law Commission in 1847. His chief contribution to political controversy was his belief in entrusting certain departments of local affairs to trained and selected experts instead of to representatives, elected on the principle of local self-government.

=== Sanitation ===
Following a serious outbreak of typhus in 1838, Chadwick convinced the Poor Law Board that an enquiry was required, and this was initially carried out by his doctor friends Arnot and Southwood Smith, assisted by another doctor from Manchester, James Kay Shuttleworth. This was the first time in British history that doctors were employed to look at the conditions which might contribute to ill health in the population. Chadwick sent questionnaires to every Poor Law Union, and talked to surveyors, builders, prison governors, police officers and factory inspectors to obtain additional data about the lives of the poor. He edited the information himself, and prepared it for publication. His Report on The Sanitary Condition of the Labouring Population of Great Britain, begun in 1839 and published in 1842, was researched and published at his own expense, and became the best-selling publication produced by the Stationery Office to date. A supplementary report was also published in 1843.

He employed John Roe, the surveyor for the district of Holborn and Finsbury who had invented the egg-shaped sewer, to conduct experiments on the most efficient ways to construct drains, the results of which were incorporated into the report, and the summary included eight points, including the absolute necessity of better water supplies and of a drainage system to remove waste, as ways to diminish premature mortality. Evidence given by Dr Dyce Guthrie convinced Chadwick that every house should have a permanent water supply, rather than the intermittent supplies from standpipes that were often provided. The report caught the public imagination, and the government had to set up a Royal Commission on the Health of Towns to consider the issues and recommend legislation. Its chairman was the Duke of Buccleuch, and there were thirteen members, including the engineers Robert Stephenson and William Cubitt. Chadwick acted as secretary in an unofficial capacity, and seems to have dominated the proceedings.

The Commission took evidence from Robert Thom, who had designed a water supply system for Greenock, Thomas Wicksteed, who was the engineer for the East London Waterworks Company, and Thomas Hawksley from the Trent Waterworks, Nottingham. These confirmed his ideas about constant water supplies, and he developed a model which he called the "venous and arterial system." Each house would have a constant water supply, and water-closets would ensure that soil was discharged into egg-shaped sewers, to be carried away and spread on the land as manure, preventing rivers from becoming polluted. Followed the publication of the commission's report, the Health of Towns Association was formed and various city-based branches were created. Chadwick later helped to ensure that the Waterworks Clauses Act 1847 became law, to limit the profits that water supply companies could make to 10 per cent, and requiring them to comply with reasonable demands for water. This included a constant supply of wholesome water for houses, and a supply for cleansing sewers and watering streets.

Chadwick wanted to see his ideas implemented over a wide area, and set about forming a company to supply water to towns, to ensure their drainage and cleansing, and to use the refuse for agricultural production. It was to have the grandiose title "The British, Colonial and Foreign Drainage, Water Supply and Towns Improvement Company", with an initial capital of £1 million, but it was the time of the Railway Mania, and he struggled to raise the finance against such competition. The company when it was eventually registered became the more modest Towns Improvement Company. Railways continued to dominate the money market, and the company was wound up after just three years. Chadwick understood that both water supply and drainage were important, since replacing earth-closets with water closets resulted in cesspools overflowing and making sanitary conditions worse, unless there were sewers to carry the waste away. This led to a rift forming between him and Hawksley, who had initially worked closely with him but who later took on water supply projects which did not include any requirement for drainage.

=== Public Health Act ===
Chadwick's report led to the Public Health Act 1848, which was the first instance of the British government taking responsibility for the health of its citizens. It had been introduced by Lord Morpeth in 1847, with the aim of requiring every town to supply water to every house, which they could do by building their own waterworks or by liaising with water companies, and to undertake drainage, sewerage and street paving projects. Most of its grand aims were considerably watered down by the time it became law, but it established a General Board of Health, whose members were Lord Morpeth, Lord Shaftesbury, and Chadwick. They were later joined by Southwood Smith, who acted as a medical advisor. Local Boards could pay for a survey from an inspector employed by the Board, and could then proceed without the need to obtain a costly local act to authorise the work. Chadwick chose all of the inspectors himself, ensuring that they shared his views on glazed sewer pipes, constant water supply and arterial drainage. They worked enthusiastically, ensuring that districts considered comprehensive schemes for water supply, drainage and sewerage.

Ratepayers in a district could request an inspector to attend if ten per cent of them signed a petition. The Board could also hold an enquiry if the death rate of a district exceeded 23 per 1000, but gauged the level of local feeling, and formed a local Board if there was support, and withdrew tactfully if there was opposition. By 1853, they had received requests for inspections from 284 towns, and 13 combined water supply, sewerage and drainage schemes had been completed under the legislation. Relationships with engineers were not always easy, with J. M. Rendel calling Chadwick's ideas "sanitary humbug" and Robert Stephenson stating that he hated the ideas of pipes, rather than brick-built sewers. Even Joseph Bazalgette, who went on to design London's trunk sewer network, spoke out against glazed sewer pipes. As time went by, there was growing opposition to what was seen as central control by the Board. The rift between Chadwick and Hawksley had become open hostility, and Hawksley made serious complaints against Chadwick and one of the Board's inspectors to a Select Committee of the House of Commons in 1853. Opposition from engineers increased, and a "Private Enterprise Society" was formed by Hawksley and James Simpson, with the intent of bringing down the Board. Shaftsbury, Chadwick and Southwood Smith all had to resign in 1854, and the Board did not last for long afterwards. Chadwick lived to see his position vindicated when the Local Government Board was established in 1871, which led to the formation of the Ministry of Health. Since then, it has been widely acknowledged that public health is a matter of government responsibility, working through local authorities.

In 1851, Chadwick made a recommendation that a single authority should take over the nine separate water supply companies that operated in London. Although this idea was rejected by the Government, the Metropolitan Water Supply Act 1852 forced the companies to move the intakes for their water to locations above Teddington weir, to filter water before it was used for domestic supply, to cover filtered water reservoirs, and to ensure that there was a constant water supply to all users by 1857. This was not achieved until 1899, and Chadwick's recommendation for a single authority was eventually implemented in 1902, with the formation of the Metropolitan Water Board.

In 1852, Chadwick conversed with Lewis Llewelyn Dillwyn in relation to the construction of a sewerage system in Swansea.

Chadwick's efforts were acknowledged by at least one health reformer of the day: Erasmus Wilson dedicated his 1854 book Healthy Skin to Chadwick "In admiration of his strenuous and indefatigable labours in the cause of Sanitary Reform".

He corresponded with Florence Nightingale on methodology. He encouraged her to write up her research into the book Notes on Nursing. He promoted it among well placed intellectuals, making her more visible.

== Later life ==
Chadwick was a commissioner of the Metropolitan Commission of Sewers in London from 1848 to 1849. He was also a commissioner of the General Board of Health from its establishment in 1848 to its abolition in 1854, when he retired on a pension. He occupied the remainder of his life in voluntary contributions to sanitary, health and economic questions.

In January 1884, he was appointed as the first president of the Association of Public Sanitary Inspectors, now the Chartered Institute of Environmental Health. Its head office, in Waterloo, London, is named Chadwick Court, in his honour.

While he is well known for his work with the Poor Law and with sanitation, he also contributed to other areas of public policy. These included tropical hygiene, criminal justice institutions, policy regarding funerals and burials in urban areas, school architecture, utilisation of sewage, military sanitation and the education of paupers. He was involved in investigations into child labour in factories, the organisation of the police force, drunkenness, the treatment of labourers on the railways, the building and maintenance of roads, organisation of the civil service, and various aspects of education. Most of these benefitted from his use of statistical methods to collect and organise data, and of the use of anecdotal evidence to support his conclusions. He was involved in a number of organisations, including the British Association for the Advancement of Science, the Institute of Civil Engineers, the National Association for the Promotion of Social Science, the Royal Society of Arts, the Royal Statistical Society, the London Debating Society and the Political Economy Club.

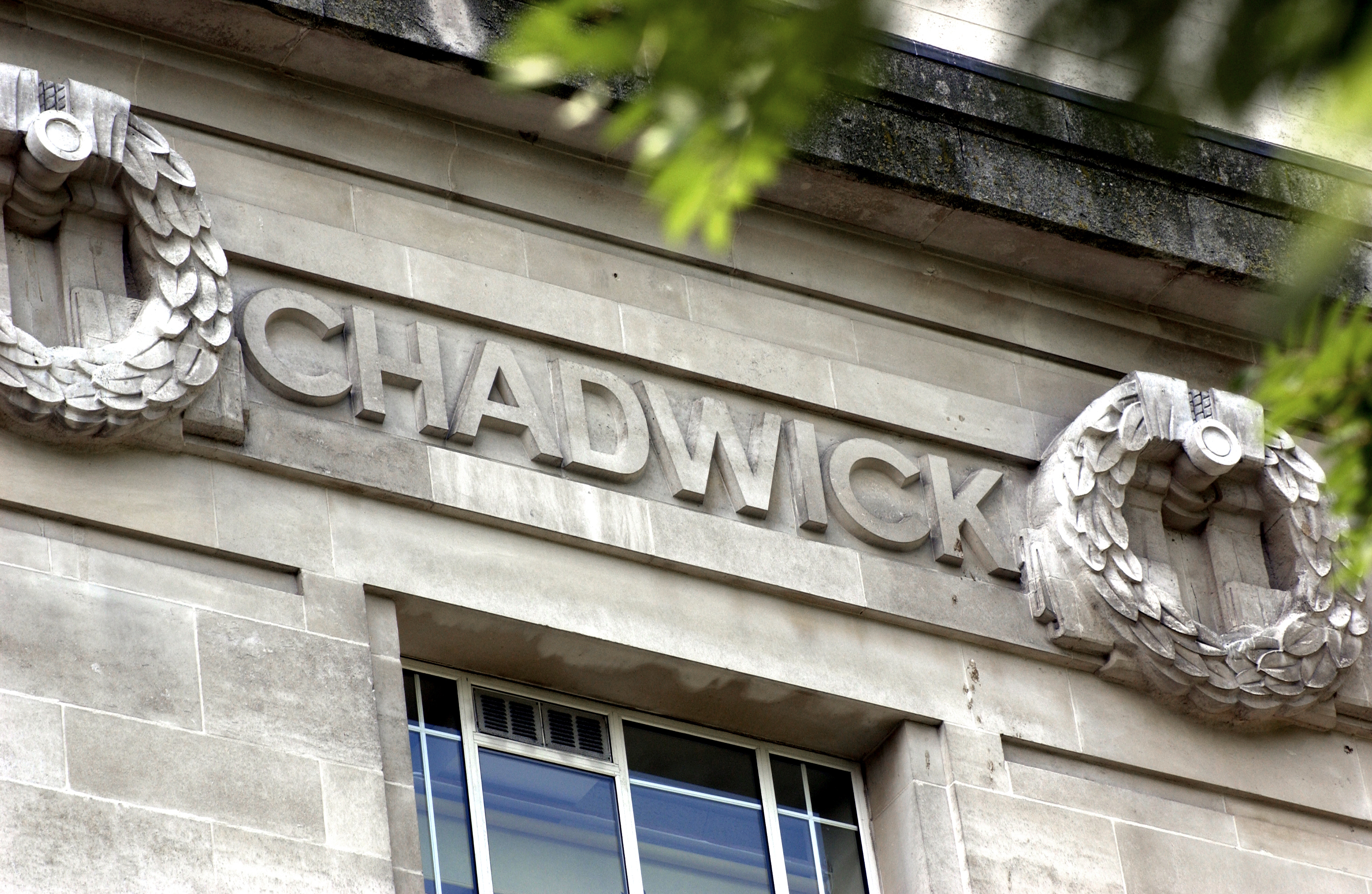
Chadwick's name as it appears on the frieze of the London School of Hygiene & Tropical Medicine

In recognition of his public service, he was knighted in 1889. He served in his post until his death, at 90, in 1890, at East Sheen, Richmond on Thames. He was buried at Mortlake Cemetery.

== Criticism and acclaim ==
Chadwick is remembered at the London School of Hygiene & Tropical Medicine where his name appears among the names of 23 pioneers of public health and tropical medicine chosen to be honoured when the School was built in 1929. He is also commemorated at Heriot Watt University in Edinburgh, Scotland for the engineering building.

Chadwick was not without contemporary critics among fellow advocates of the causes he espoused and largely on the basis of his disregard for local government. One such was his successor as head of the Board of Health, Sir Benjamin Hall, later Lord Llanover, an advocate of decentralisation through the strengthening of municipalities. Hall believed that the centralisation of powers in the Board of Health, a body that was in effect independent of government and not obliged to align with municipalities, and the manner in which Chadwick set a course that frequently put it at odds local and national government, made the Board ineffective. Another critic was the representative of national government, Lord Seymour, later the Duke of Somerset, under whom as First Commissioner of Works from 1851-1852 the Board nominally fell. He was one of the three Commissioners who formed the Board, but was more often than not overruled by Chadwick and the third Commissioner, Dr Thomas Southwood Smith. In July 1858, in a piece covering the a programme of government to clean up the River Thames through provision of funds for that purpose to the Metropolitan Board of Works, a body set up by Sir Benjamin Hall during his own tenure as First Commissioner of Works (1855-1858), The Holborn Journal describes Chadwick as the influence behind "that sharp, persevering set of centralising meddlers".

In their 1936 history of the governance of London, Sir Gwilym Gibbon and Reginald Bell say of Chadwick and the Board of Health that "by the end of its first term of office such a storm of unpopularity and opposition broke over it that the Government was defeated on the Bill to renew its appointment. [It] had foundered on the rock of its own uncompromising zeal."

According to Priti Joshi in 2004 the evaluation of his career has drastically changed since the 1950s:

The Chadwick that emerges in recent accounts could not be more different from the mid-century Chadwick. The post-war critics saw him as a visionary, an often-embattled crusader for public health whose enemies were formidable but whose vision, extending the liberal and radical tradition, ultimately prevailed. Cultural critics, on the other hand, present a Chadwick who misrepresented (if not outright oppressed) the poor and who was instrumental in developing a massive bureaucracy to police their lives. Thus, while earlier accounts highlighted Chadwick's accomplishments, the progress of public health reforms, and the details of legislative politics, more recent ones draw attention to his representations of the poor, the erasures in his text, and the growing nineteenth-century institutionalization of the poor that the Sanitary Report promotes. Chadwick, in other words, is portrayed as either a pioneer of reform or an avatar of bureaucratic oppression.

Such views are not universally held. Thus Ekelund and Price in their assessment of Chadwick's economic policies in 2012 wrote:

It is no exaggeration to note that Chadwick is an almost singular progenitor of public health in the UK and elsewhere. The one hundredth anniversary of his death (1990) and the one hundred and fiftieth anniversary of the first Public Health Act (1848) was an occasion of serious and deserved plaudits for him in the United States and abroad. His prowess in sanitation engineering has also been duly noted. These excellent works appropriately feature Chadwick's role as one of the two or three most important policy makers of nineteenth century England.

== Works ==
- (PDF) Report on The Sanitary Condition of the Labouring Population of Great Britain, London: Edwin Chadwick, 1842
- The present and general condition of sanitary science: an address, in reply to the memorial presented at the festival dinner, on March 2nd, 1889 (1st ed.), London: Edwin Chadwick, 1889, Wikidata Q20980589 – via Wikisource

== Collections ==
In 1898 the executor of Sir Benjamin Ward Richardson's estate presented University College London with Chadwick's archive. Richardson was Chadwick's biographer and friend. The collection spans over 190 boxes of material, around half of which is correspondence. It also documents Chadwick's involvement with Poor Law reforms and public health improvements.

== See also ==
- History of public health in the United Kingdom
