= Health of Towns Association =

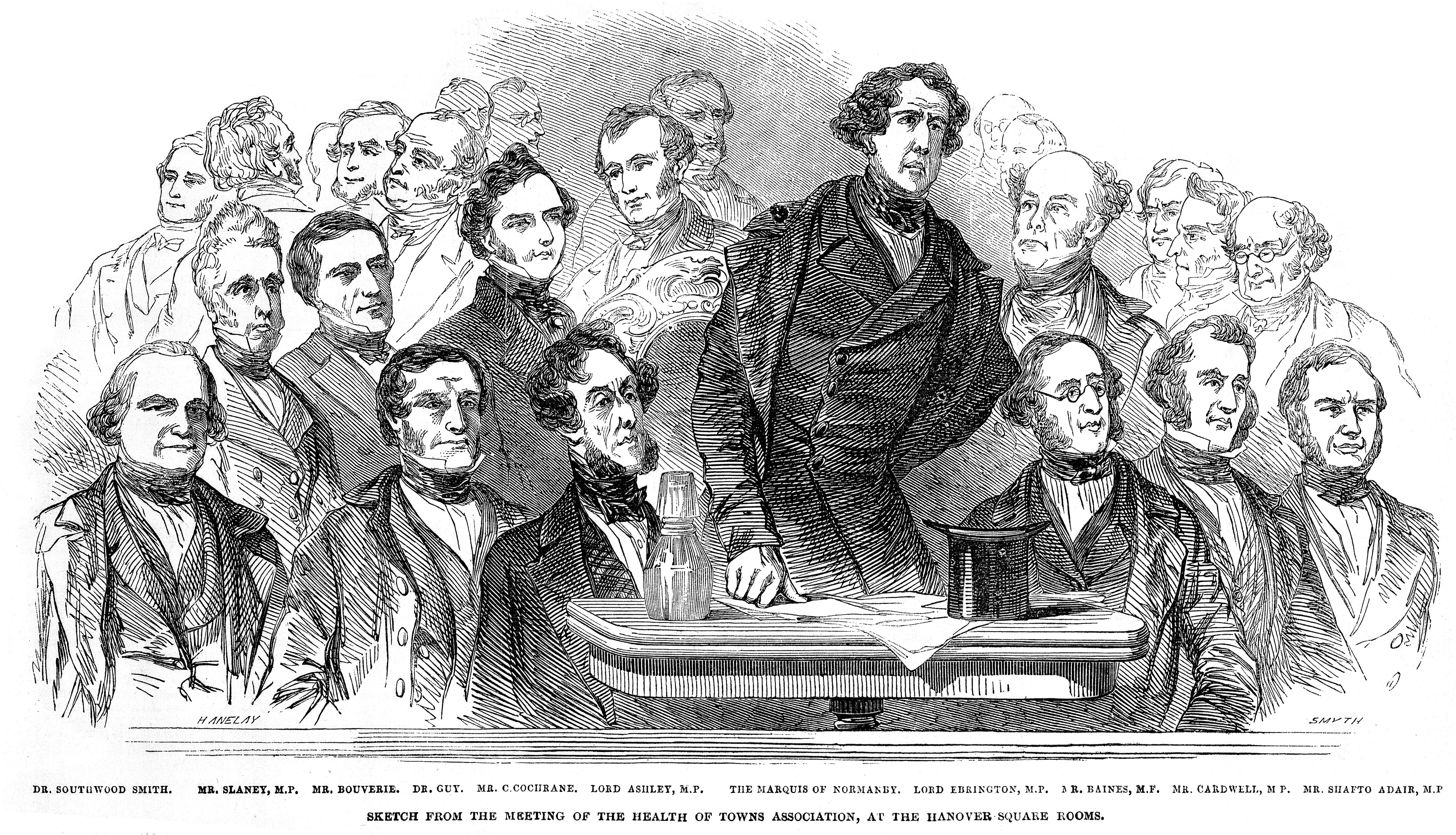
Health of Towns Association Meeting, 1847

The Health of Towns Association was a key organisation in the development of public health in the United Kingdom and was formed at a meeting in Exeter Hall, London on 11 December 1844. Its formation followed the 1843 establishment of the Royal Commission into the Health of Towns chaired by Sir Edwin Chadwick, which produced a series of reports on poor and unsanitary conditions in British cities, quickly prompting the creation of Health of Towns Association branches in several major cities, including Edinburgh, Liverpool, and Manchester.

These national and local movements led to the passing of the Public Health Act 1848 (11 & 12 Vict. c. 63).
