= Health in Wales =

Health in Wales refers to the overall health of the population of Wales.

== Public Health Wales ==
The Public Health Wales Observatory produces annual Demography Profiles for the Welsh local health boards and has done since 2009. The Observatory is part of the Health Intelligence Division of Public Health Wales.

== Health Service ==
As health is a devolved power, from the UK Government, it is the responsibility of the Minister for Health and Social Services for Wales and the Welsh Government, which are responsible for the running of the National Health Service in Wales, all aspects of public health and health protection in Wales, the Food Standards Agency in Wales, post-graduate medical education and any charges for NHS services.

=== Prescriptions ===
In 2007, Wales became the first UK country to introduce free prescriptions. to all its citizens.

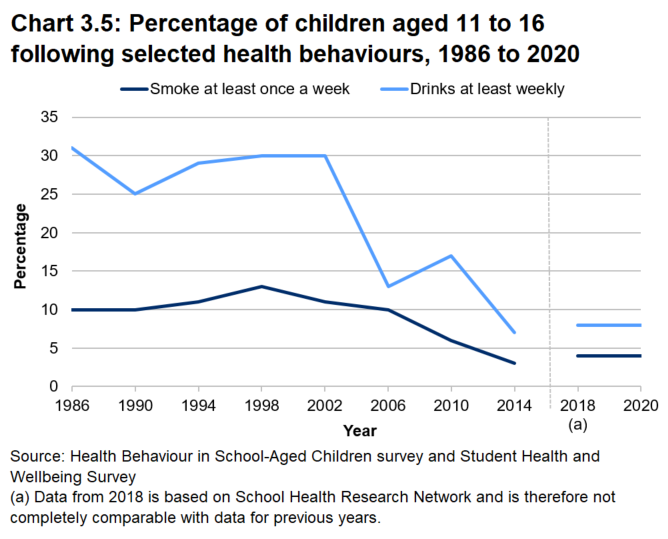
Children smoking and drinking in Wales 1986-2020.

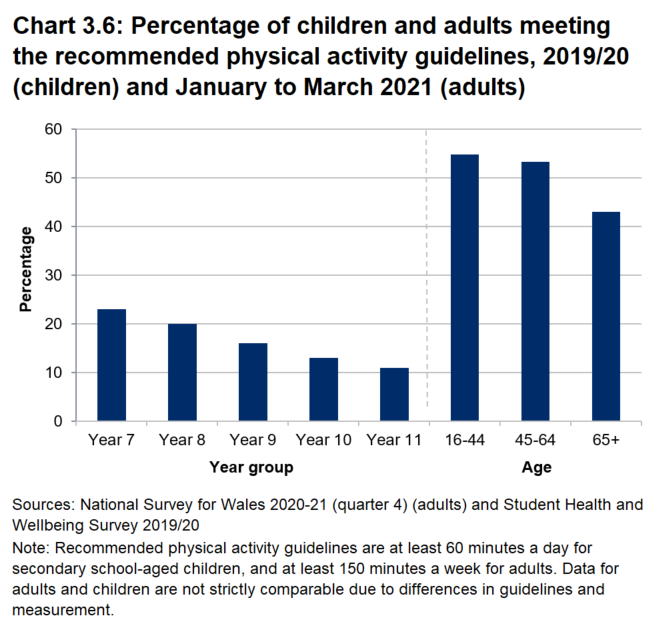
Percentage of children and adults meeting recommended physical activity 2019-20 children, and 2021 adults.

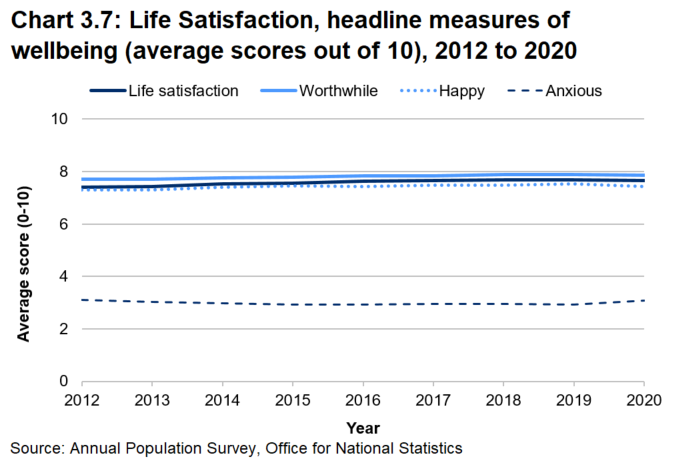
Life satisfaction in Wales 2012-2020.

== Smoking and drinking ==
In April 2007, ahead of England, it became the first to ban smoking in NHS hospitals and in 2019, the first country in the UK to ban smoking in outdoor school spaces, playgrounds and hospital grounds.

January to March of 2020-21:

- The smoking rate was 14%
- 17% of adults drank more than the weekly guidelines
- 31% of adults (16+) ate the recommended portions of five fruit or vegetables a day in 2020-21
- around 7% of adults reported following fewer than 2 healthy lifestyle behaviours

Previous years shows no significant change in the proportion of adult reporting less than two healthy lifestyle behaviours between 2016-17 and 2019-20.

Smoking and drinking rates for children fell significantly between 2002 and 2014, and have not changed significantly in 2018-2020. The proportion of children who followed less than two healthy lifestyle behaviours hasn’t changed for 2021 at 12%.

== Exercise ==
32% of adults took part in sport at least three times a week during the 2019-20 period, which was the same level as the previous two years. The proportion of adults not partaking in any sport also stayed stable at 41%.

Those more likely to partake in sporting activities three or more times a week included: men, younger age groups and people in employment.

The latest school sports survey, which is from 2018, showed that 48% of pupils from Year 3 to Year 11 participated in sports 3 times a week, similarly to 2015. This followied a large increase innactivity from 2013 to 2015.

Change in exercise levels during the pandemic varied. Study by Sport Wales showed that inequalities in sport participation increased during the covid pandemic. Older adults and adults in lower socio-economic groups were most likely to participate in sport less frequently. Children from lower socio-economic households were also less likely to participate in sport less frequently.

== Mental health ==
The average life satisfaction has been increasing since 2011-12 up until the covid pandemic. Average anxiety levels have also slightly reduced up until this point. The most recent data collected before the onset of the covid pandemic showed a slight deterioration in life satisfaction and anxiety.

== Life expectancy ==
Life expectancy at birth was 82.1 years for women and 78.3 years for men for the period 2018-20.

Analysis using 2017 to 2019 statistics showed that the gap in the "healthy" life expectancy (measured using sloped index of inequality) was 17 years for males and 18.3 years for females and remains stable.

"Healthy" life expectancy was only 61.7 years in Wales in 2020, and just 50.7 years in the most deprived communities according to BHF Cymru.

== Causes of death ==
Welsh men were expected to live an average of 78.3 years and women 82.3 years in 2014 - about a year less than in England.

West Wales and the Valleys had the second-highest death rate from respiratory diseases of any region in Europe in 2015 at 152 per 100,000 population.

The number of alcohol-related deaths in Wales was 504 in 2016 8.9% more than in the previous year. There were also 271 drug poisoning deaths, involving both legal and illegal drugs, compared with 238 in 2015.

== See also ==
- Healthcare in Wales
- NHS Wales
- Public Health Wales
- Health in the United Kingdom
