= Health in Scotland =

Chart displaying life expectancy rates in Scotland

Across Scotland, there are significant differences within health outcomes between the most deprived and wealthiest areas of the country. Scotland has a significantly shorter life expectancy amongst the countries of the United Kingdom as well as the rest of Western Europe. The Scottish Government has introduced a number of measures, including the establishment of Public Health Scotland in April 2020 as the public health agency responsible for increasing healthy life expectancy and reduce premature mortality. Public Health Scotland acknowledge that Scotland has a "number of significant public health challenges" including drug related deaths, environmental sustainability and climate change.

Across all OECD countries, Scotland ranks in the bottom 36% in health, whilst it ranks in the top 24% of OECD countries in life satisfaction. Health in Scotland is the responsibility of the Scottish Government, with the Cabinet Secretary for Health and Social Care responsible for government policy, NHS Scotland and performance across healthcare. Other significant positions responsible for health across the country include the National Clinical Director of Healthcare Quality and Strategy and the Chief Medical Officer for Scotland.

== Legislation ==
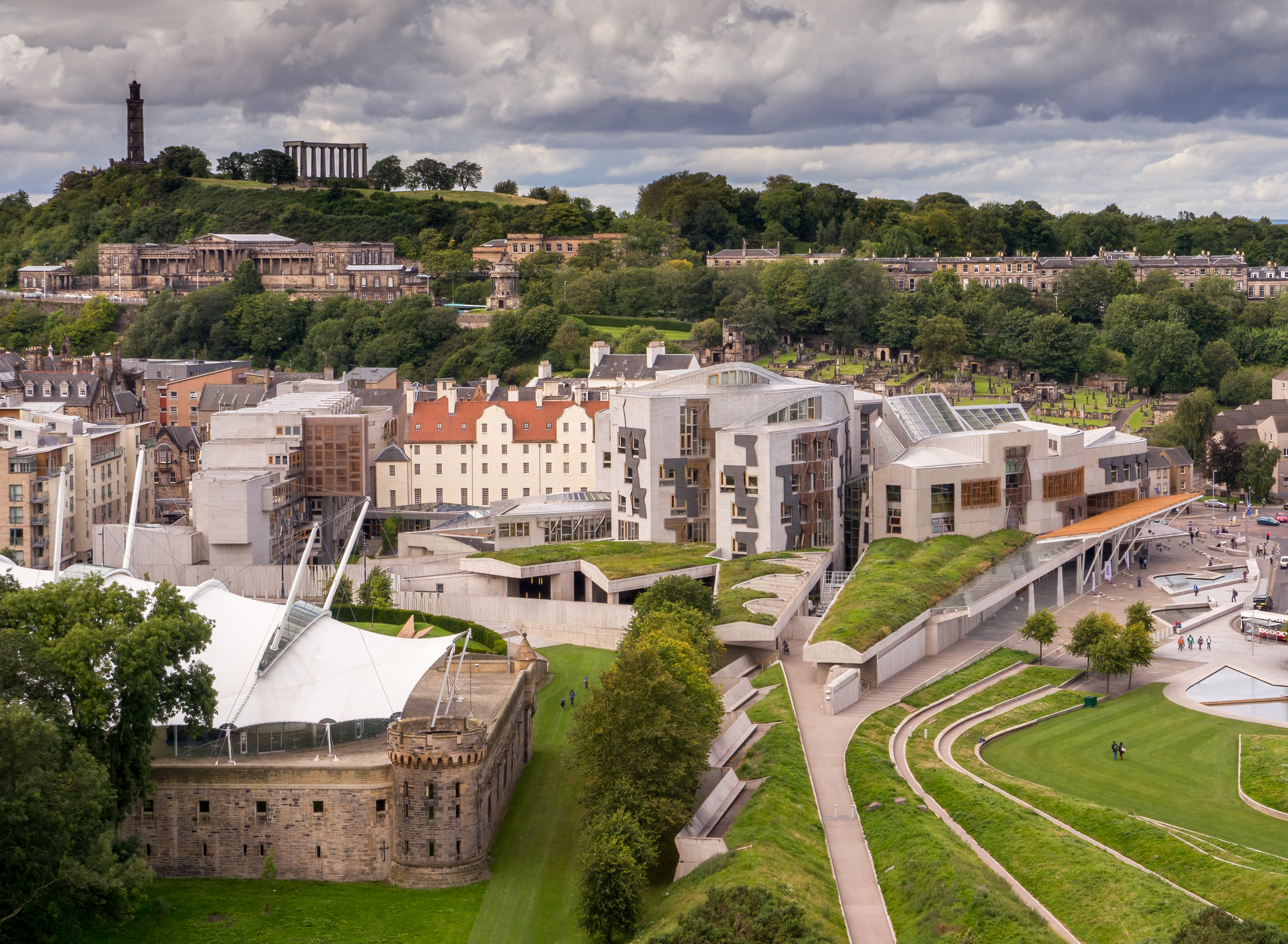
The Scottish Parliament in Edinburgh is primarily responsible for health services in Scotland

Following Scottish devolution 1999, all areas of responsibility for health and social care policy and funding became devolved to the Scottish Parliament, whilst a few aspects of Scottish health policy, such as surrogacy, remain reserved powers of the UK government. Prior to the re–establishment of a Scottish Parliament in 1999 following Scottish devolution, Scotland still had a separate health care system from the rest of the United Kingdom between 1948 until 1999, with the Scotland Office responsible for health care policy and NHS funding in the country. Following devolution, those powers, amongst others, were transferred to the Scottish Government.

NHS Scotland spending per head of the population in Scotland was estimated at £2,396 per person in 2018–19. The Scottish Cabinet member for Cabinet Secretary for Health and Social Care is directly responsible for all areas of health and social care in Scotland for which the Scottish Parliament has devolved powers over, and is supported in their capacity by the Minister for Public Health and Women's Health, Minister for Social Care, Mental Wellbeing and Sport and the Minister for Drugs and Alcohol Policy. The Scottish Government is also responsible for creating and implementing public health initiatives and promoting and protecting the health and wellbeing of the population across the country.

The responsibility of implementing health care approaches is primarily the responsibility of the fourteen different NHS Scotland health boards across the country. They are directly accountable to Scottish Government ministers and ultimately responsible to the Scottish Parliament. On 1 April 2016, it became mandatory for all NHS Scotland health boards and local authorities across Scotland to integrate some aspects of health and social care services.

== Births and deaths statistics ==
| Period | Live births | Deaths | Natural increase |
|---|---|---|---|
| January – March 2024 | 11,548 | 16,592 | -5,044 |
| January – March 2025 | 11,432 | 16,157 | -4,725 |
| Difference | ▼ –116 (–1.00%) | ▼ –435 (–2.62%) | ▲ +319 |

== Healthcare ==
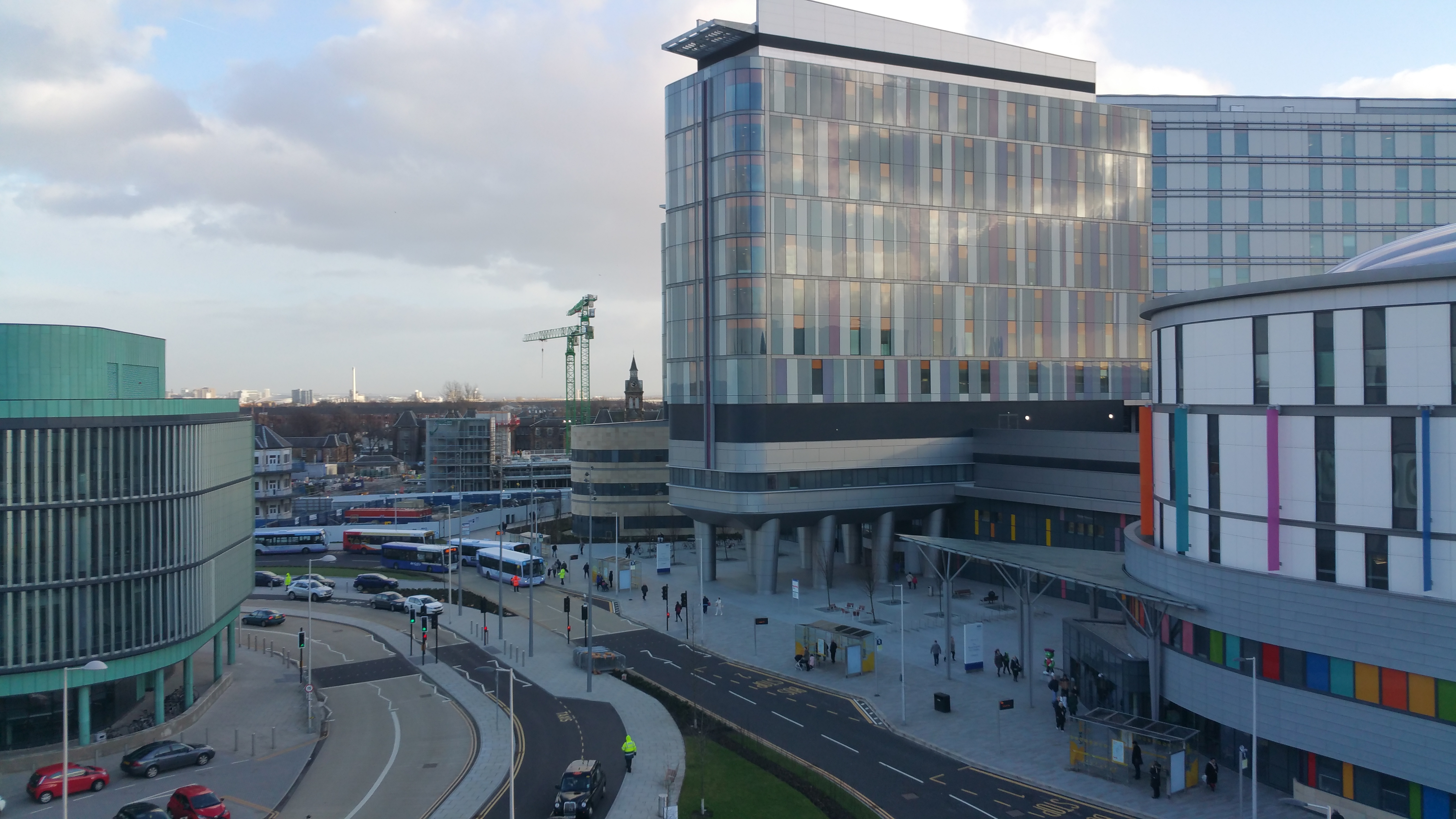
Queen Elizabeth University Hospital in Glasgow, a NHS Scotland hospital which is the largest acute hospital in Europe

Healthcare in Scotland is mainly provided by Scotland's public health service, NHS Scotland. It provides healthcare to all permanent residents free at the point of need and paid for from general taxation. Health is a matter that is devolved, and considerable differences have developed between the public healthcare systems in the different countries of the United Kingdom. In 2011, the Scottish Government, led by the Scottish National Party (SNP), abolished prescription charges. As a result, any Scottish prescription prescribed to patients by a doctor in Scotland and for dispensing in Scotland would be provided free of charge. The Scottish Government has remained committed to free prescriptions in the country and have no current plans to reintroduce any form of charge for prescriptions, in spite of a suggestion that the reintroduction of charges could generate £50 million for NHS Scotland. Though the public system dominates healthcare provision, private healthcare and a wide variety of alternative and complementary treatments are available for those willing to pay.

There has been no evidence provided through various studies which define the abolition of prescription charges in Scotland as being either an effective or ineffective policy when it comes to reducing the number of hospital admissions. A 2025 report from Audit Scotland into NHS Scotland highlighted the need for reform in the service, particularly regarding the way the Scottish Government scrutinises the NHS regarding its operations.

== School immunisations ==
In Scotland, all children aged between 13 and 18 years are vaccinated against tetanus, diphtheria and polio, commonly when they are in secondary school in Third year. Additionally, children in S3 and S4 receive a vaccination against MenACWY. In their first year of secondary school, children are routinely vaccinated against HPV, whilst all children in both primary and secondary school are offered yearly Influenza vaccination usually between September–December. Data obtained by Public Health Scotland show that boys are less likely to take all three vaccines against girls. Vaccinations for children are commonly offered whilst they are at school, and conducted by health professionals from NHS Scotland, such as a school nurse.

== Alcohol ==
High rates of alcohol related illnesses pose a major public health challenge for Scotland. NHS Scotland estimate that there were 3,705 deaths attributable to alcohol consumption in 2015, this equates to 6.5% or around 1 in 15 of the deaths for the whole of Scotland for that year. Alcohol misuse was estimated to cost the Scottish economy £3,560,000,000 per year in 2007. Alcohol consumption in Scotland is approximately 20% higher than in England and Wales.

=== Public Health Measures ===
==== Drink driving limit ====
In December 2014, the Scottish Government reduced the legal drink driving limit in an effort to reduce the number of alcohol-related deaths and serious injuries on Scottish roads. The reduction in the legal limit of blood alcohol levels from 80 mg to 50 mg in 100ml of blood brought Scotland in to line with other European countries such as France, Germany, Italy and Spain. However, within two years after the new law was introduced, the rates of road traffic accidents in Scotland had not decreased. One possible explanation is that the change in the limit may not have been enforced or publicised sufficiently to have the expected effect in reducing accidents.

==== Minimum unit pricing ====
In 2012, the Scottish Government passed legislation to introduce a statutory minimum price per unit of alcohol to try to reduce alcohol consumption. The legislation was subject to legal challenges by alcohol trade bodies including the Scotch Whisky Association but was ultimately upheld by the Supreme Court of the United Kingdom. The Act came into effect on 1 May 2018 with an initial minimum price of 50p per unit. In 2023, some politicians called to amend minimum pricing laws to increase to 80p per unit.

In April 2024, the Scottish Parliament voted to keep Minimum Unit Pricing, and to increase the minimum price to 65p per unit, an increase of 15p since the introduction of the policy six years earlier. Criticisms were that the levy imposed on alcohol misuse did not correlate with a decline in consumption of alcoholic beverages, as deaths from alcohol reached high levels on a par with 2008.

== Drugs ==
Drug misuse mortality rate in Scotland in 2017–2021 mapped

Scotland has the highest number of drug related deaths of any European country, and is three times higher than the second highest number of drug related deaths in Europe, the Republic of Ireland. Drug related (or misuse) mortality rates have begun to rise in Scotland since the 1980s. Since 2015, mortality rates have dramatically increased, doubling from their previous numbers a decade ago. A factor of this can traced to the more recent ageing of the so-called 'Trainspotting generation' (those who grew up in the 1980s and 1990s) which has given rise to increased mortality rates. Funding cuts in 2016 by the Scottish Government reduced drug and alcohol prevention services funding by 20%, though by 2019 this had been restored. Additional reasons may be related to the failings of the UK's drug policy due to drug policy not being a devolved policy issue within Scotland.

Research conducted in 2019 has shown Scotland has had a larger number of drug deaths than the United States, which was thought to be the highest in the world. In the US in 2017 the rate of drug deaths of 217 per million of the population is now slightly lower than Scotland's rate (218 deaths per million of population). According to the Guardian newspaper, the increase in drug deaths in recent years are due to benzodiazepines, heroin and ecstasy.

In 2020 1,339 deaths related to drug misuse were registered in Scotland, a 5% increase on 2019, and the highest ever recorded. 63% were of people aged between 35 and 54, and men were 2.7 times as likely to have a drug-related death as women. People living in the most deprived areas were 18 times more likely to die from a drug-related condition than those in the least deprived areas. The Scottish Drug Deaths Taskforce reported that use of naloxone kits may have saved almost 1,400 lives in 2020. In 2021, 1,187 people died in Scotland as a direct result of a drug overdose. Nearly half of the drug deaths in Scotland were attributed to methadone.

In January 2025, the UK's first drug consumption room was opened in Glasgow in an attempt to combat drug related deaths and to prevent the sharing of needles.

== Obesity ==
Across Scotland in 2023, the Scottish Government estimated that almost 32% of adults across Scotland were living with obesity which marked the highest level since obtaining data regarding obesity began. Additionally, it marked a 10% increase from data obtained in 2004 (24%). The Health and Sport Committee has called for more action to tackle Scotland's "obesogenic environment". 17% of children in the same time period were found to be at risk of obesity. Obesity is regarded in Scotland as being a major contributing factor to a range of health complications including type 2 diabetes, cardiovascular disease (CVD), hypertension, asthma and high cholesterol.

Obesity levels in Scotland are the highest amongst the countries of the United Kingdom, with an estimated cost of tackling obesity being estimated at £5.3 billion of public spending. The spending on tackling obesity across the country is projected to increase in the future. Obesity is regarded as the leading cause of death in the country, and is attributed to 23% of all deaths recorded in Scotland.

== Smoking ==
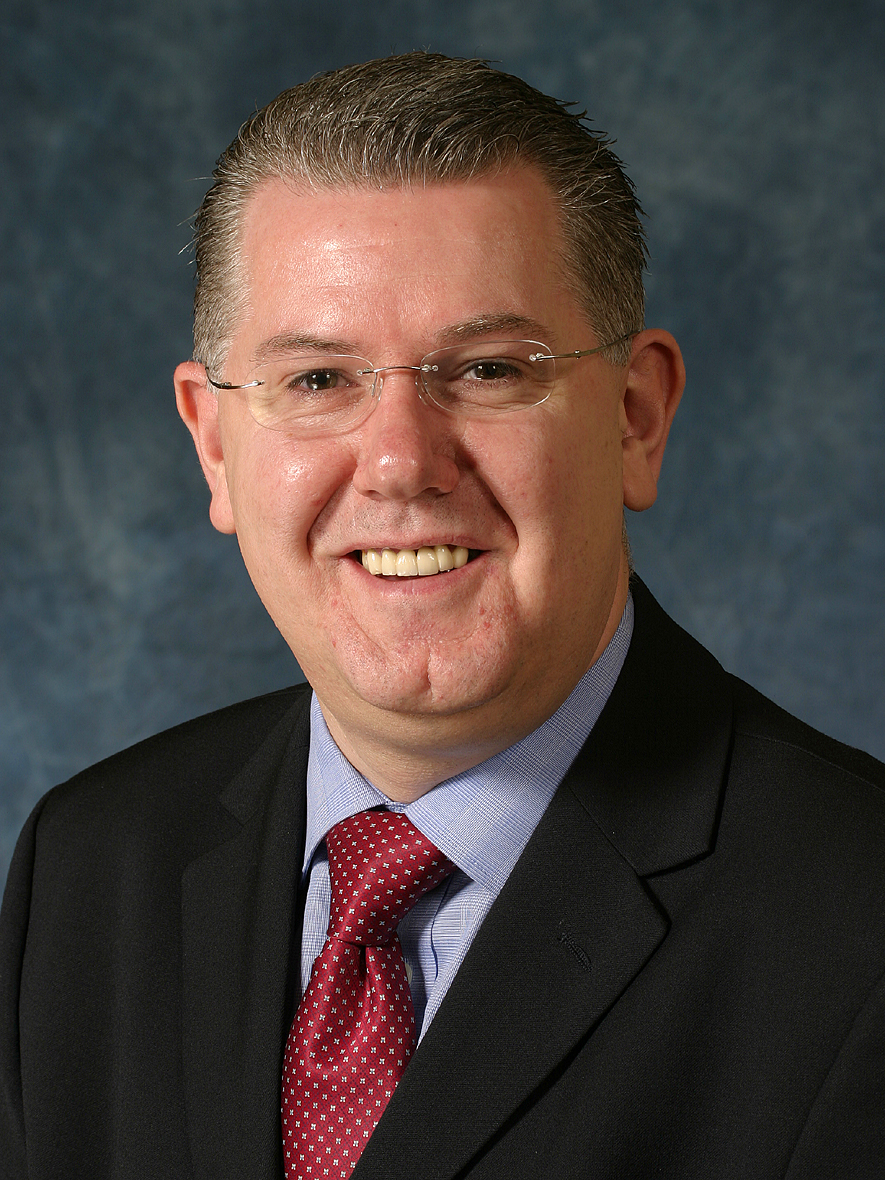
Andy Kerr (pictured) was the Minister for Health and Community Care who introduced the successful Smoking, Health and Social Care (Scotland) Act 2005

Scotland was the first country in the UK to enact a smoking ban in public places. The legislation was passed in the Scottish Executive in 2005 and came into force on 26 March 2006. The effect of the smoking ban has been found to be positive with an 18% drop in the rate of child asthma admissions per year and a 17% reduction in heart attack admissions to nine Scottish hospitals. In 2015, 87% of Scottish adults were found to be in favour of the ban, with only 8% opposed.

The tobacco control strategy has had a "positive impact". Scottish smoking rates fell from 31% in 2003 to 21% in 2015. There is a socio-economic gradient with 35% of people living in the most-deprived areas smoking compared to 10% in the most affluent areas.

The Scottish Government has set an objective for Scotland to become tobacco-free by 2034. As a result of the lack of knowledge of the long term conditions and side effects of vaping, the Scottish Government are increasingly concerned about vaping, particularly amongst young people. One of the measures introduced to combat young people beginning to vape will see the sale of disposable vapes in Scotland becoming banned from 1 June 2025. Another reason for the ban on disposable vapes was the environmental aspect, with littering commonplace; raising concerns amongst dog walkers.

== Mental health ==
There is some evidence that Scottish patients more often seek medical help with stress, anxiety and depression than patients across the countries of the United Kingdom. Mental health is regarded by NHS Scotland as "one of the major public health challenges" across the country, with one in four people affected by a form of mental health annually. In June 2023, the Scottish Government published their Mental Health and Wellbeing Strategy to improving mental health and access to services across the country. The Mental Health (Care and Treatment) (Scotland) Act 2003 is the primary piece of legislation affecting mental health in Scotland and applies to anyone defined as having a "mental disorder", defined under the act as "any mental illness, personality disorder or learning disability".

Scotland is also looking to trial a dedicated mental health ambulance service, following success of a similar scheme in Sweden. Government spending in Scotland on mental health was estimated to be £1.3 billion in the 2021–22 financial year. A significant funding boost and policy change has led to the enhancement of mental health services, including the establishment of mental health hospitals such as the £46 million Woodland View in Irvine, North Ayrshire.

== See also ==
- Drug crisis in Scotland
- Glasgow effect
- Homelessness in Scotland
- NHS Scotland
- List of hospitals in Scotland
- Social care in Scotland
