= Janet Aitken (physician) =

British physician

Janet Kerr Aitken CBE MD FRCP
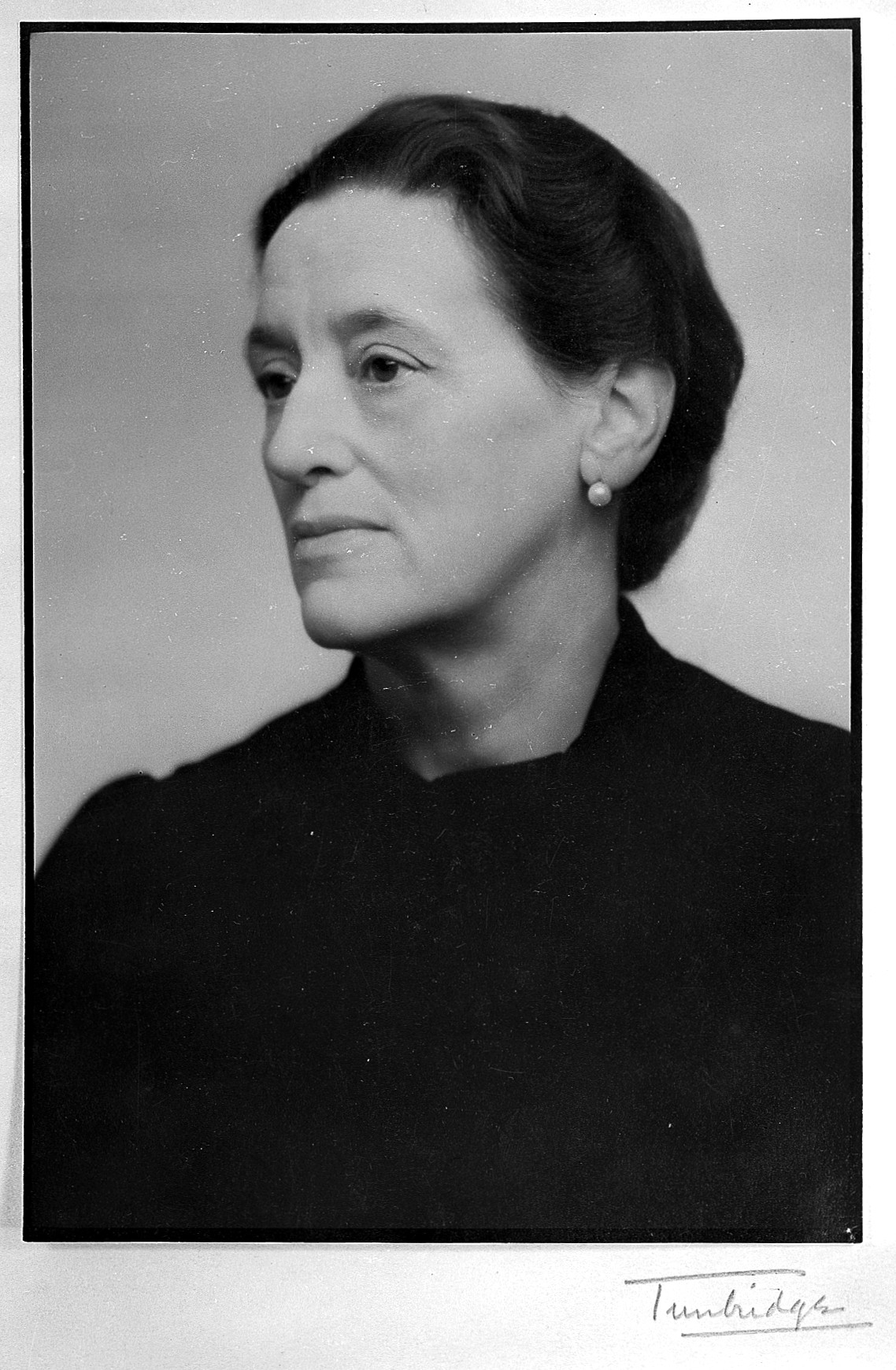
- Photograph of Janet Aitken from the Medical Women's Federation archives.
- Born: 1886; Buenos Aires, Argentina
- Died: 11 April 1982 (96)
- Education: St Leonards School, St Andrews; London School of Medicine for Women
- Occupation: Physician
- Title: President of the Medical Women's Federation
- Term: 1940–1942
- Predecessor: Elizabeth Bolton
- Successor: Clara Stewart

Janet Kerr Aitken (1886 – 11 April 1982) was a specialist in juvenile rheumatism and President of the Medical Women's Federation from 1940 to 1942. She was a consultant physician at the Elizabeth Garrett Anderson Hospital in London.

== Early life and education ==
Janet Aitken was born in Buenos Aires, Argentina. She studied at St Leonards School, St Andrews, and initially intended to study music. She studied piano, taking the LRAM, and was also awarded the gold medal for singing in 1912 from the Manchester School of Music.

With the outbreak of World War I, Aitken trained as a masseuse in order to help injured servicemen, and she obtained a qualification from the Incorporated Society of Masseurs. This led to an interest in medicine, which she followed by enrolling in the London School of Medicine for Women. She graduated in 1922. In 1924, she qualified as a Medical Doctor, and in 1926 obtained the Membership of the Royal Colleges of Physicians of the United Kingdom.

== Career ==
Aitken began her medical career at the Elizabeth Garrett Anderson Hospital as a house physician and clinical assistant. She rose to the rank of consultant in 1929 and became a physician in charge of the Kensington Supervisory Rheumatic Clinic for Children shortly thereafter. The field of juvenile idiopathic arthritis was her speciality.

In the 1930s, Aitken was vice-dean of the Royal Free Hospital School of Medicine and also served on the committees of hospitals and of the Central Health Services Council and the British Medical Association.

Aitken became the President of Medical Women's Federation in 1940, during the "difficult war years". She later became honorary secretary of the organisation, and her home was used as the office. Aitken obtained her FRCP in 1943. In 1949, she was appointed to the Medical Advisory Committee to the NHS.

In 1955, she was elected to the General Medical Council, topping the list of nominees with 16,500 votes. She was the first woman to be on the council, as Christine Murrell had been elected in 1933, but died before taking up her seat. Not long before her appointment to Council, Aitken had mused on the challenges of such "firsts":

It is, I think, the first step which counts; once a woman has been appointed, if she is a wise woman and good at her work, our male colleagues get used to the idea and the next time a woman applies she is more or less considered on her merits. The first woman to be appointed anywhere has a great responsibility, as if she is not found to be a good colleauge the pendulum swings back and another chance is not given for some time.

== Awards and honours ==
Aitken was appointed Commander of the Order of the British Empire in the 1950 New Year Honours.
