= Milson (name) =

Milson is a given name and an English, patronymic surname, a variant of Melson.

Notable people with the name include:

== Given name ==
- Milson Hunt (1926–1988), Former Wales international rugby league footballer
- Milson Jones (born 1959), Jamaican gridiron football player
- Milson Ferreira Dos Santos (born 1977), Brazilian footballer
- Milson Russen Rhodes (1871–1929), English general practitioner

== Surname ==
- Felício Milson (born 1999), Angolan footballer
- James Milson (1783–1872), Early settler of Australia
- John Milson Rhodes (1847–1909), English general practitioner

== See also ==
- Milson (disambiguation)
