= Georgiana Bonser =

British physician (1898–1979)

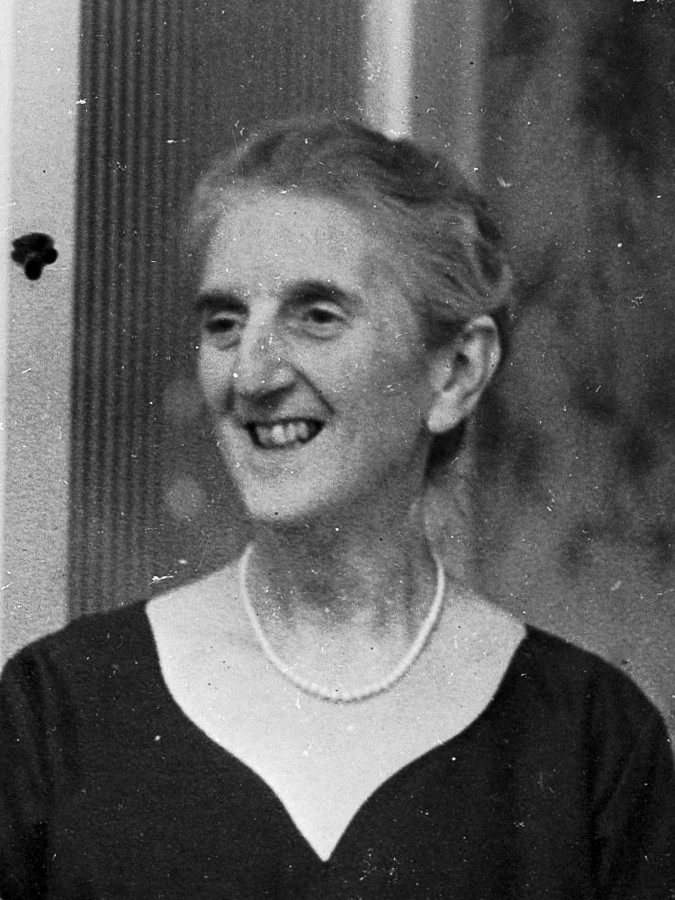
- Born: Georgiana May Duthie; 5 May 1898; Manchester, England
- Died: 9 June 1979 (aged 81)
- Education: Manchester High School for Girls; Manchester University; King's College Hospital
- Known for: Manchester Royal Infirmary's first woman house surgeon; Developing strains of inbred mice; Research in cancer-causing effects of soot, aromatic amines, food additives; First woman chairman of the Leeds Division of the British Medical Association
- Medical career
- Profession: Physician
- Field: Oncology
- Institutions: Manchester Royal Infirmary; University of Leeds; Leeds General Infirmary; Pontefract General Hospital; St James's Hospital
- Research: Cancer

Georgiana May Bonser (née Duthie; 5 May 1898 – 9 June 1979) was a British physician and researcher in cancer at the University of Leeds, and consultant at St James's Hospital. She was Manchester Royal Infirmary's first woman house surgeon and later the first woman chairman of the Leeds Division of the British Medical Association.

Bonser's early research focussed on lung cancer in Leeds, hereditary factors in breast cancer, and testicular cancer in York's blast furnace workers. She developed strains of inbred mice and led early investigations into whether chemicals used in the dyeing industry caused bladder cancer. Later, the UK government asked her to look at the risk of cancers from food additives and preservatives.

Between 1959 and 1960, Bonser was president of the Medical Women's Federation. Following her retirement in 1963, she continued to be involved at her university's cancer research centre and in the breast clinic at Leeds General Infirmary. In 1966, she delivered the Goulstonian Lecture.

== Early life and education ==
Georgiana Bonser was born Georgiana May Duthie on 5 May 1898 in Manchester, the daughter of Ogilvie Duthie, Salford's director of education. She completed her secondary education at Manchester High School for Girls, before gaining admission to study medicine at Manchester University and then qualifying as a doctor at London's King's College Hospital in 1920. The subject of her dissertation was morbid anatomy.

== Early career ==
Following an appointment as Manchester Royal Infirmary's first woman house surgeon, though discouraged from pursuing a surgical career, Bonser took up a post as anatomy demonstrator under John Stopford. In 1923, the year after joining the British Medical Association (BMA), she gained her MD with distinction, and became president of the women's union at Manchester University. In the same year she earned the university's first Dickinson travelling fellowship, with which she chose to study at the Pasteur Institute, Paris, for a year. It was there, that she possibly became interested in genetics. It was in Paris that she met Kenneth John Bonser, an architect whom she later married in 1926 in Leeds.

=== Lung, breast, and testicular cancer ===
Bonser was appointed to research cancer at the Department of Experimental Pathology and Cancer Research, Leeds University, by Richard Douglas Passey in 1927. (Note: Passey had been appointed there the previous year.) That year, after Passey returned from a meeting in Manchester, which reported increasing cases of lung cancer in that city, he asked Bonser to investigate cancers of the respiratory tract in Leeds. Her paper on the topic in 1929, found a general increase in cases of lung cancer, but no particular rise in Leeds. She then looked at the possibility of hereditary factors playing a role in causing breast tumours in mice, and simultaneously followed-up siblings of a group of people treated for breast cancer. She persuaded Passey to use strains of inbred mice to investigate carcinogenic effects of soot in York's blast furnace workers. Her findings of triphenylethylene inducing testicular cancers in mice were published in the early 1940s. Her introduction of these mice and laboratory approach to research led to criticism from the senior surgeon at St Mark's, John Lockhart-Mummery, who was secretary of the British Empire Cancer Campaign and preferred a clinical approach. To this, Bonser responded:

No-one would deny that Mendelian laws are as applicable to the human as to the tall and short peas which Mendel used in his original experiments. Yet Mendel could not have formulated the laws if he had not studied an obvious character in a quickly growing plant. Similarly, in the study of breast cancer the use of inbred mice is an invaluable aid to the elucidation of the problem in man.

=== Bladder cancer ===
With her colleagues, Bonser investigated how aromatic amines worked and whether they could cause cancer. She was asked to study data on bladder cancer in dye workers at ICI, Huddersfield. In the 1930s she led early investigations into whether some of these chemicals in the dyeing industry could cause cancer in bladders. At the time, attempts to cause bladder cancer in animals with chemicals from the dye industry or urine of workers affected with bladder cancer had been unsuccessful, despite knowing an association between bladder cancer and the dye industry since the late nineteenth century. Assisted by chemists D. B. Clayson and J. W. Jull, she was helped by the surgical skills of urologist Leslie Pyrah. Together they studied the effects of the dye precursor 2-Naphthylamine and other aromatic chemicals with cancer causing properties. For example, by implanting 2-Naphthylamine directly into bladders in paraffin pellets, it was shown that the compound did not cause cancer directly but required metabolic transformation to activate it as a carcinogen.

Her work on this, published later, showed that 2-Naphthylamine could induce bladder cancer in dogs, hepatomas in mice, hyperplasia of the bladder lining in rabbits, and papillomas of the bladder in rats. Some of the benign tumours she found have later been found to be precancerous conditions. She remained supported by Passey and pathologist Matthew John Stewart, and became good friends with Stewart's wife, Clara.

== Later career ==
In 1942, after the department of cancer research closed, Bonser was appointed morbid anatomist to Pontefract General Hospital. In 1948, three years after taking the MRCP and six years before being elected fellow of the College, she moved to St James's Hospital, Leeds, where she continued as a part-time consultant until she retired. In the same year she gained a permanent teaching post at the Department of Experimental Pathology and Cancer Research. Between 1948 and 1952 she reported on a series of new cases of lung cancer at three hospitals; Aberdeen, Leeds and Birmingham. Her findings noted that males in urban areas had a higher rate of lung cancer, but when females were exposed to the same industrial hazards, they were also more likely to develop lung cancer. In 1949, she chaired the committee of the then new Pathological Museum at Leeds.

In 1952 Wilhelm Hueper invited Bonser to speak to the National Cancer Institute. In 1953, just over 30 years after joining the British Medical Association, Bonser became the first woman chairman of the organisation's Leeds Division. In 1955 Bonser pointed out that "since the introduction of the regulations for the control of asbestos dust in 1931, the amount of exposure of the workers to dust has been enormously reduced".

In addition to several lectures Bonser delivered in the United States, in 1956 the Indian Government invited her to address Mumbai's Cancer Research Centre. The following year the Ministry of Health chose her to sit on their committee that looked at the risk of cancers from food additives and preservatives. Two years later, Bonser was the only woman scientist among 25 experts contributing to an international symposium on cancer, held in Israel.

Between 1959 and 1960, Bonser served as president of the Medical Women's Federation. She then co-authored Human and Experimental Breast Cancer, published in 1961. In it she gave a good description of types of blunt duct adenosis, a controversial term for a type of breast lesion. Also, in the early 1960s she investigated several artificial food dyes and advised government on which ones could cause cancer. Following her retirement in 1963, Bonser continued to be involved at her university's cancer research centre and the breast clinic in Leeds General Infirmary. In 1965 she was the only woman member of a sub-committee of 22, appointed to look at toxic chemicals in agriculture and storage of food. Bonser delivered the Goulstonian Lecture in 1966, and in 1967, she delivered the Ernestine Henry Lecture.

== Death ==
Bonser died on 9 June 1979, at the age of 81.

== Selected publications ==
- Bonser, Georgiana M. (1929). "The Incidence of Tumours of the Respiratory Tract in Leeds". The Journal of Hygiene. 28 (4): 340–354. doi:10.1017/s0022172400009669. ISSN 0022-1724. JSTOR 40006888. PMC 2167744. PMID 20475004.
- Bonser, Georgiana M. (April 1942). "Malignant tumours of the interstitial cells of the testis in strong a mice treated with triphenylethylene". The Journal of Pathology and Bacteriology. 54 (2): 149–154. doi:10.1002/path.1700540202. ISSN 0368-3494.
- Bonser, Georgiana M. (January 1943). "Epithelial tumours of the bladder in dogs induced by pure β-naphthylamine". The Journal of Pathology and Bacteriology. 55 (1): 1–6. doi:10.1002/path.1700550102. ISSN 0368-3494.
- Bonser, Georgiana M.; Clayson, D. B.; Jull, J. W.; Pyrah, L. N. (March 1954). "The experimental aspects of industrial bladder cancer". British Journal of Urology. 26 (1): 49–52. doi:10.1111/j.1464-410X.1954.tb04734.x. PMID 13149845.
- Bonser, Georgiana M; Clayson, D B; Jull, J W; Pyrah, L N (September 1956). "The Carcinogenic Activity of 2-Naphthylamine". British Journal of Cancer. 10 (3): 533–538. doi:10.1038/bjc.1956.62. PMC 2073828. PMID 13396104.
- Bonser, G. M.; Bradshaw, L.; Clayson, D. B.; Jull, J. W. (September 1956). "A further study of the carcinogenic properties of ortho hydroxy-amines and related compounds by bladder implantation in the mouse". British Journal of Cancer. 10 (3): 539–546. doi:10.1038/bjc.1956.63. ISSN 0007-0920. PMC 2073824. PMID 13396105.
- Bonser, Georgiana M; Clayson, D B; Jull, J W; Pyrah, L N (September 1956). "The Carcinogenic Activity of 2-Naphthylamine". British Journal of Cancer. 10 (3): 533–538. doi:10.1038/bjc.1956.62. PMC 2073828. PMID 13396104.
- Bonser, Georgiana (1977). "4. Tumours of the ovary". In Zuckerman, Solomon; Weir, Barbara J. (eds.). Physiology (2nd ed.). New York: Academic Press. pp. 129–175. ISBN 0-12-782602-5.
