= Socialist Health Association =

Left-wing medical association in the UK

Logo of the SHA.

The Socialist Health Association (SHA, called the Socialist Medical Association before May 1981) is a socialist medical association based in the United Kingdom, affiliated to the Labour Party as a socialist society.

== History ==
The Socialist Medical Association was founded in 1930 to campaign from within the Labour Party for a National Health Service in the United Kingdom and absorbed many of those who had been active in the State Medical Service Association, which collapsed as a result. The inaugural meeting was convened by Charles Wortham Brook, a doctor with links to the Labour Party who was a member of the London County Council (LCC) during the period when the LCC developed its municipal hospitals. Brook was the first Secretary of the Association, remaining in office until 1938.

Many of those involved in the Association volunteered for the Spanish Medical Aid Committee in the Spanish Civil War.

Somerville Hastings was founder President of the Socialist Medical Association (SMA) 1930–1951. He served in the Royal Army Medical Corps during the First World War, followed by work as an aural surgeon at the Middlesex Hospital. He was a Member of the London County Council for fourteen years.

In 1945 there were nine members of the association in the House of Commons. They hoped to influence the plans for the development of the National Health Service (NHS). The Association had held a Health Workers’ Convention at Conway Hall, London in 1943, which was attended by health workers and union representatives. A further event, also at Conway Hall Ethical Society, took place in 1946, delivering 14 lectures and an exhibition as part of a Health Services Week. There were communications with Aneurin Bevan but his relations with the group were not particularly close. The Association was keen to press for doctors to be salaried and work full-time in health centres. They wanted teaching hospitals to be integrated into the regional hospital organisations and criticised the segmentation of the service as a barrier to integrated services. The first anniversary of the NHS was celebrated by the Association with a meeting of 300 attendees at Conway Hall Ethical Society.

The association was active in campaigns against NHS charges, smoking and tuberculosis, and for adequate nutrition, the establishment of health centres and salaried general practitioners. It is associated with the campaigns against health inequality.

It attempted to build an international movement. In October 1962 David Stark Murray went to the University of Chicago to talk to students about the fight for socialised medicine.

It changed its name in May 1981 to the Socialist Health Association to reflect increased interest in public health. It is a socialist society affiliated to the Labour Party.

It was active in the campaign against the Health and Social Care Act 2012.

Alex Scott-Samuel, a public health physician and retired lecturer in public health at the University of Liverpool, was elected Chair in 2017 and held the position until 2020. On behalf of the Association he proposed a resolution at the 2017 Labour Party Conference confirming Labour's opposition to Conservative policies for the NHS in England and calling for the reinstatement of the NHS "as per the NHS Bill (2016-17)". It was carried unanimously.

== Notable members ==
- Debbie Abrahams MP
- Christopher Addison, 1st Viscount Addison
- Prof John Ashton
- John Baird MP
- John Biggs
- Arthur Blenkinsop MP
- Sir Albert Bore
- Aleck Bourne
- Charles Wortham Brook
- Ritchie Calder, Lord Calder
- Sir Iain Chalmers
- Dame June Clark
- Tam Dalyell MP
- Terry Davies MP
- Sir Richard Doll
- Dr John Dunwoody MP
- Michael English MP
- Dr Hugh Faulkner
- Michael Foot MP
- Dr Robert Forgan MP
- Dr Brian Gibbons AM
- Will Griffiths MP
- Dr Leslie Haden-Guest MP
- Dr Julian Tudor Hart
- Somerville Hastings MP
- Baroness Dianne Hayter
- Dame Joan Higgins
- Sir Benedict Hoskyns
- Philip Hunt, Lord Hunt
- George Jeger MP
- Dr Santo Jeger MP
- Dr Tony Jewell
- Melanie Johnson MP
- Dr Horace Joules
- Dr David Kerr MP
- Sir Dick Knowles
- Prof John Marrack
- Dr Maurice Miller MP
- Dr H. B. Morgan MP
- David Stark Murray
- Dr Doug Naysmith MP
- Stanley Newens MEP
- Dr David Owen, Lord Owen, MP
- Sylvia Pankhurst
- Nicolas Rea, 3rd Baron Rea
- Esther Rickards
- Dame Jane Roberts
- Dr V. H. Rutherford MP
- Dr Onkar Sahota
- Dr Alfred Salter MP
- Prof Wendy Savage
- Dr Sam Segal MP
- Prof Aubrey Sheiham
- Thora Silverthorne
- Dr Barnett Stross MP
- Dr Edith Summerskill MP
- Dr Shirley Summerskill MP
- Dr Cyril Taylor
- Dr Stephen JL Taylor MP
- Sir Bernard Tomlinson
- Fiona Twycross
- Patrick Vernon
- Anne Weyman;
- Prof Richard G. Wilkinson
