= Millson =

Millson is a surname. Notable people with the surname include:

- Greg Millson, former drummer in the Canadian band "Great Lake Swimmers"
- John Millson (1808–1874), U.S. Representative from Virginia
- John Millson (Canadian politician), Canadian politician and businessman
- Joseph Millson (born 1974), English actor and singer

== See also ==
- Port Hope (Millson Field) Aerodrome west northwest of Port Hope, Ontario, Canada
- Milson (disambiguation)
- Mylson
