= Doctors in Unite =

UK trade union for doctors

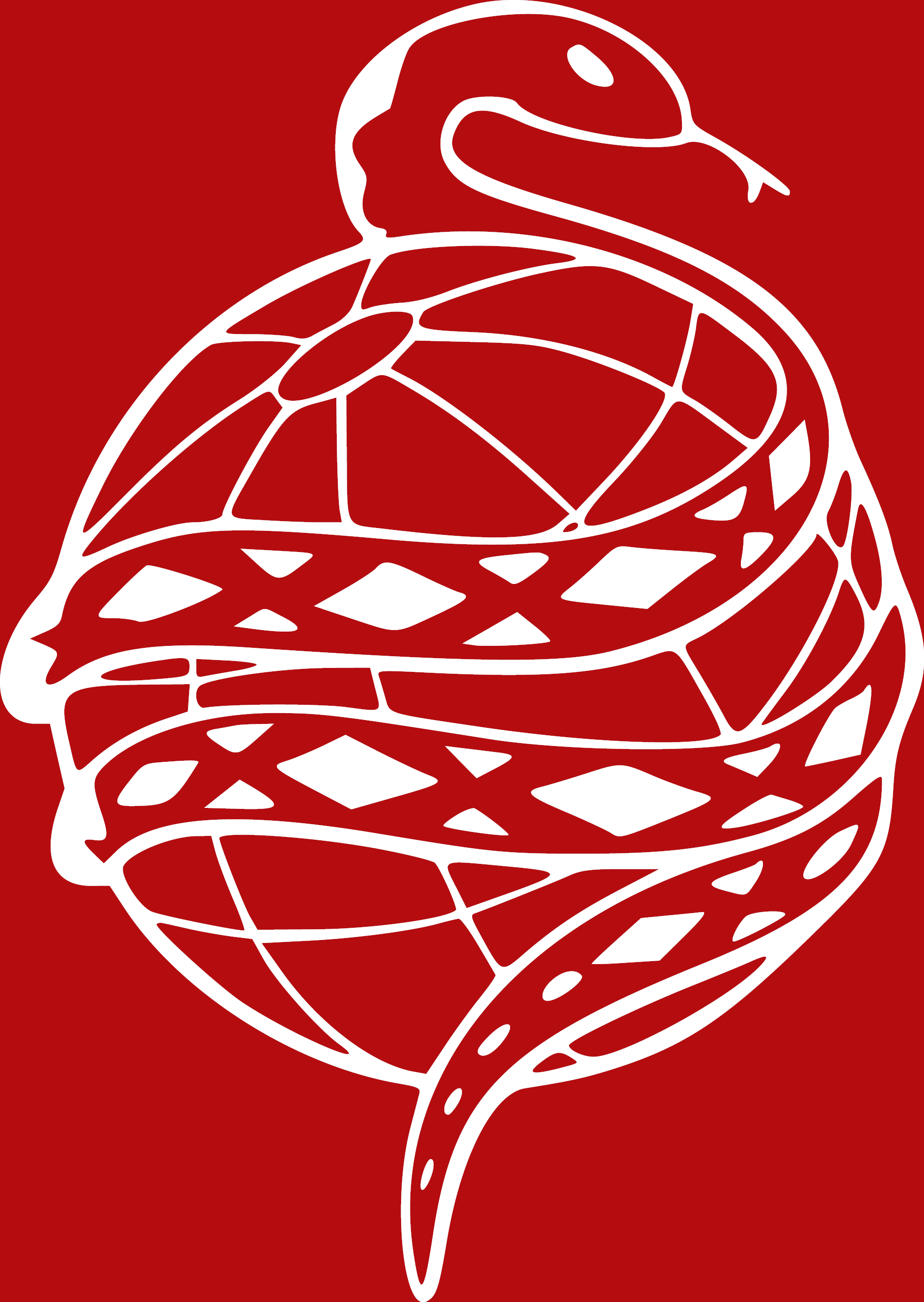
- Logo since 2019
- Founded: 1914
- Headquarters: London, WC1; United Kingdom
- Location: United Kingdom
- Key people: Coral Jones (chair)
- Affiliations: TUC, Unite the union
- Website: doctorsinunite.com drs-in.unitetheunion.org

Doctors in Unite is a trade union for doctors in the United Kingdom. It was formerly known as the Medical Practitioners' Union (MPU) before its affiliation with Unite.

== Origin ==
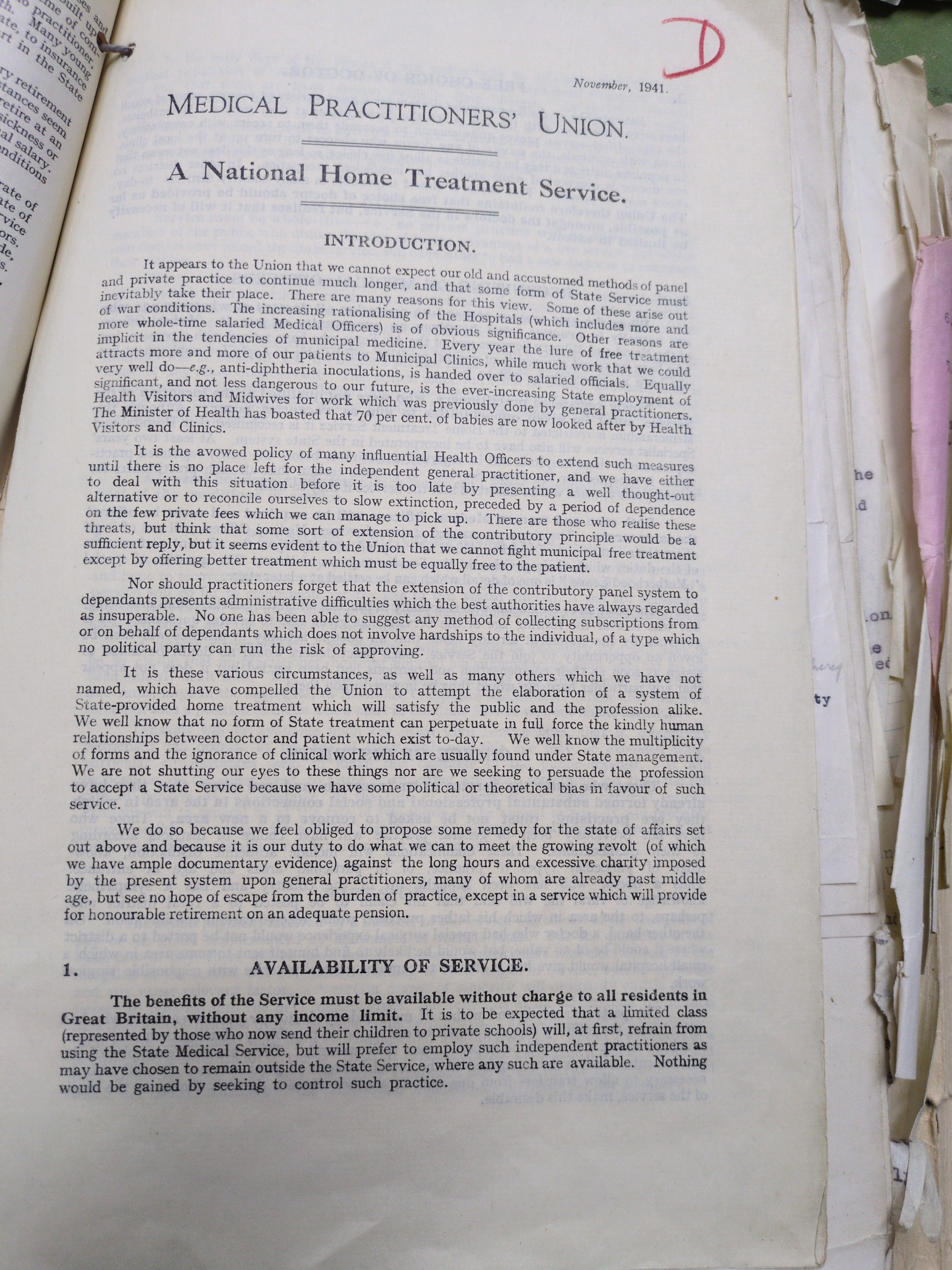
An MPU proposal for a National Home Treatment Service dating back to 1941 - before the foundation of the NHS. National Archives, London.

The union was founded as the Panel Medical Practitioners' Union in 1914. It was then renamed the Medico Political Union, and then the Medical Practitioners' Union in 1922. It amalgamated with the Association of Scientific, Technical and Managerial Staffs in 1970 under the leadership of Hugh Faulkner. It underwent a series of mergers which formed the Manufacturing, Science and Finance union, Amicus and ultimately Unite.

Initially the MPU focused on providing trade union services to GPs in their dealings with local administration of the National Health Insurance scheme, and arguing the case for the extension of the scheme to everyone. The MPU's aims from the outset were to extend the provision of medical care by the state, while retaining the independence of general practitioners.

== History ==
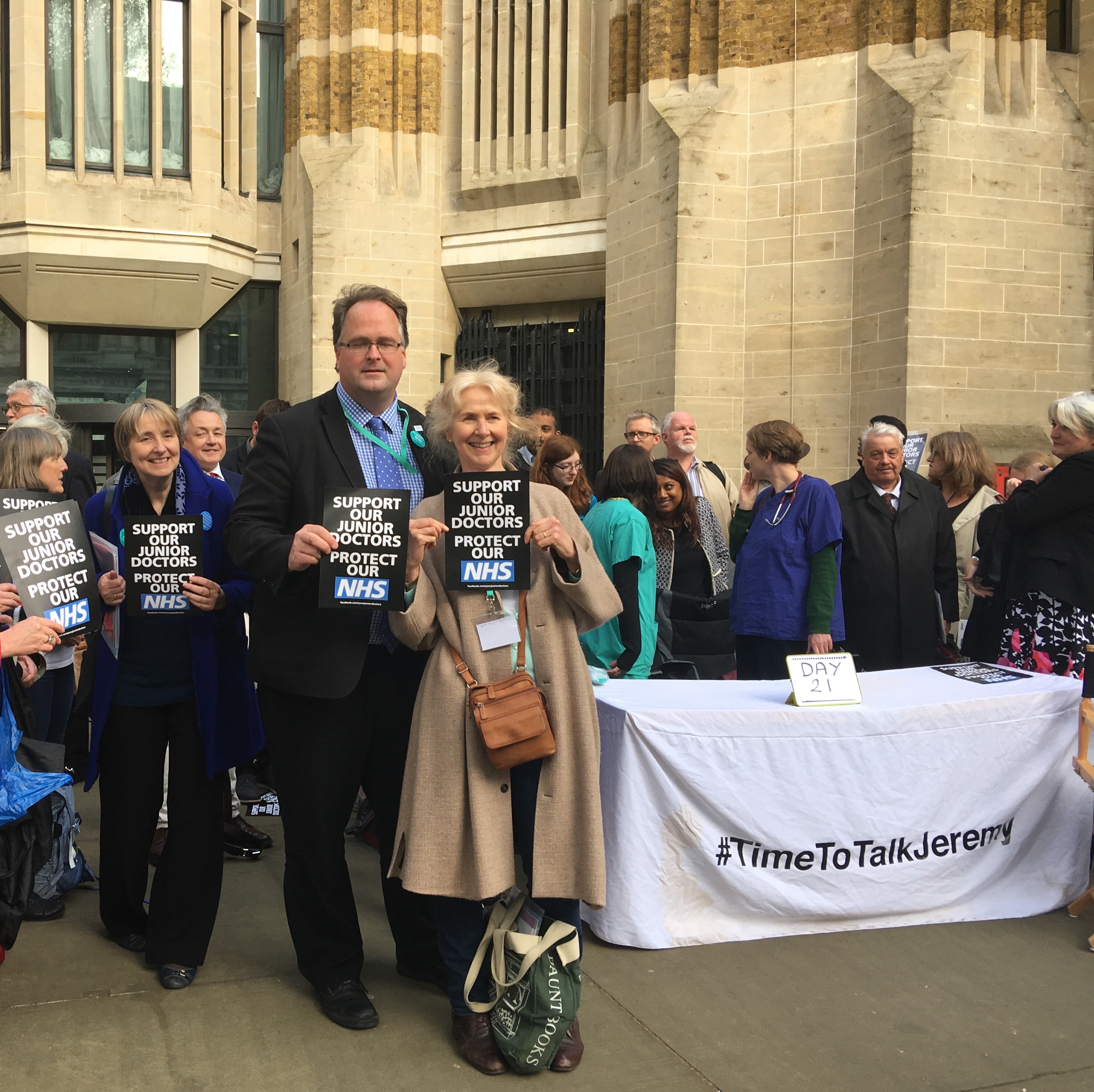
Doctors in Unite members supporting junior doctors outside the Department of Health in 2016

In the 1950s the MPU focused its attention on occupational health, following the failure to secure the inclusion of occupational health in the NHS when it was established in 1948.

In the 1960s the MPU produced the first ever study of the working patterns of women doctors. This led to demands by the MPU and the Medical Women's Federation for the establishment of part-time posts. The MPU also produced the Family Doctors' Charter, and called for the modernisation of general practice. After a campaign by the MPU, the BMA also supported this. Its implementation lead to a significant improvement in general practice.

In the 1970s the MPU renewed its demands for the introduction of part-time posts. It promoted a resolution at the Junior Doctors' Conference calling for such posts. The resolution initially passed, but was then rejected by the BMA's Annual Representative Meeting. However, because of the autonomy guaranteed to MPU representatives, it was still possible for junior doctors to pursue the issue, despite BMA opposition. They succeeded, placing medicine ahead of many other professions in the recognition of part-time work.

In the 1980s the MPU continued to pursue the issue of women's equality, producing the document Women in Medicine which addressed the needs of women doctors, women's health and issues of family-friendly employment for doctors of all genders. It also fought a long campaign to reduce the hours of work of junior doctors. This including several Parliamentary bills promoted by MPs allied to the Association of Scientific, Technical and Managerial Staffs union, which detailed proposals on how hours of work could be reduced. There were a series of associated demonstrations, including sleep-ins. Eventually the campaign enabled the BMA to negotiate a new deal on hours of work. The MPU also conducted research documenting racial discrimination in medical recruitment.

Towards the end of the 1980s the MPU produced a document on medical ethics called A Charter of Patient's Rights and Medical Ethics, in conjunction with the Patients Association. It proposed that the composition of the NHS' democratic structure could involve elected neighbourhood health committees, where local communities would pursue measures to improve the health of the community. This would provide a grass roots structure for the control of the NHS, with district, regional and national tiers partly elected directly and partly built up from below. The proposed neighbourhood health committees would consist partly of local residents elected by the local community, partly of health workers elected by their colleagues, and partly of health workers elected by the local community. This made it possible to for health workers and elected community representatives to both be in the majority group.

In the 1990s the MPU focused on opposition to GP fundholding, a policy introduced by Margaret Thatcher's government where GPs held budgets for their patients' care. The MPU proposed its replacement - locality commissioning, where local communities would plan, and allocate resources for, health care which serves their community. Locality commissioning became Labour Party policy in the 1992 election. The document Alternatives to Fundholding, which expanded on these ideas, was produced following the 1997 election. In 1993 it initiated a campaign for a salaried GP option and published "Salaried Service; Threat or Opportunity" in 1997. The policy favoured providing a salaried option for general practitioners who would be employed by the NHS.

Locality commissioning was widely endorsed by doctors, including the BMA, and was implemented by the incoming Labour government in 1997. Sadly, its roots in communities and primary care were soon eroded by commercialisation and competitive markets. The MPU once again had to advocate for an NHS which would be the mechanism for society to pursue health as a social goal. In 2019 it published proposals for public health and primary care in local neighbourhoods.

== Relationship with the British Medical Association ==
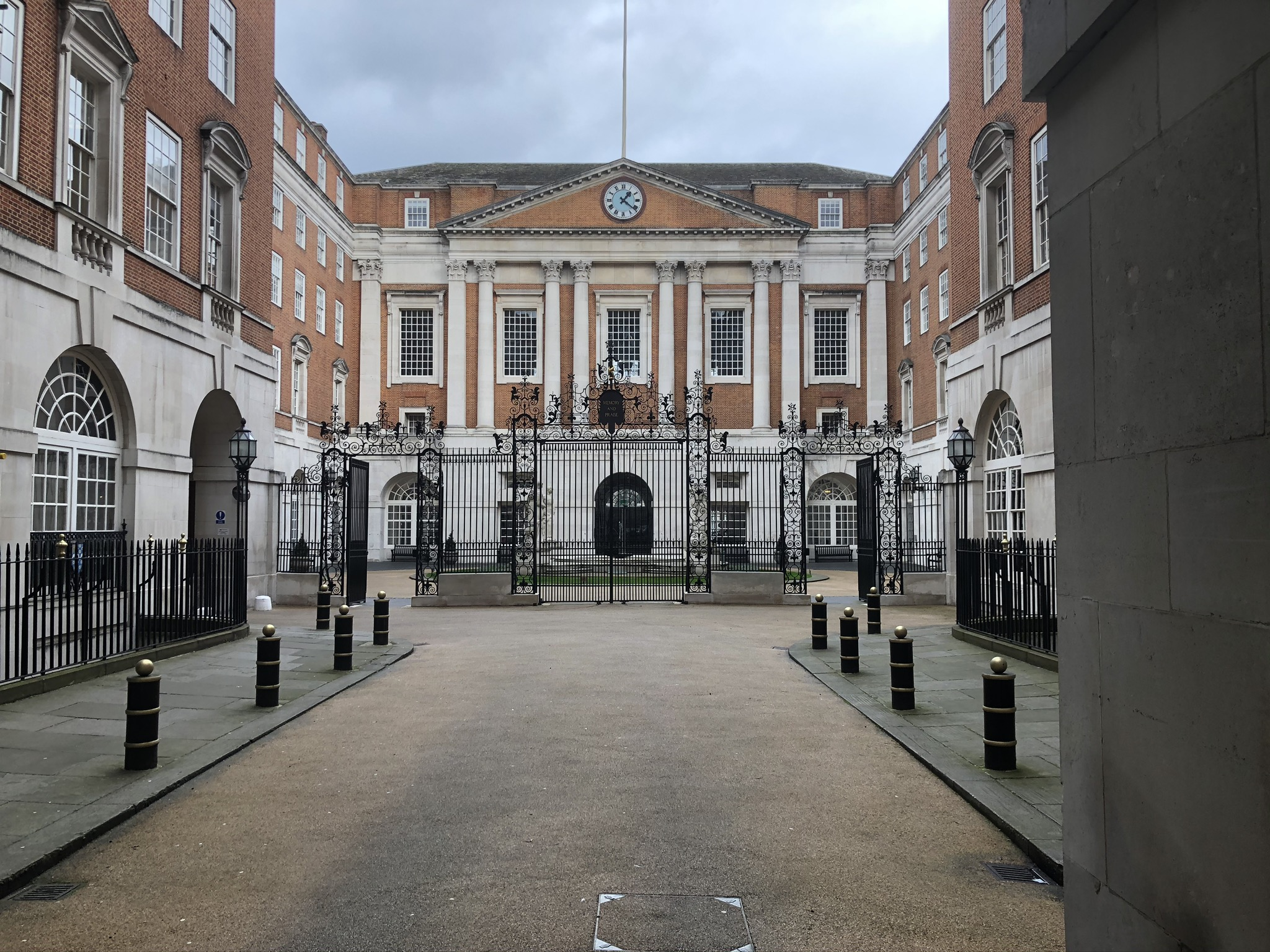
BMA House, Tavistock Square, London

In the 1930s the MPU produced proposals for a National Health Service. The BMA also campaigned for an NHS at the time, but in the 1940s divisions emerged between the two organisations. The MPU supported Aneurin Bevan's plans. The BMA however was concerned by issues that arose in local authority hospitals in the 1930s, and abandoned its previous support for an NHS run by county councils. Instead it firmly opposed nationalisation of hospitals and state employment for doctors.

The MPU was originally the only medical trade union until the BMA registered as a trade union In 1971. The Hospital Consultants and Specialists Association followed suit in 1974.

The MPU was the only TUC affiliated medical trade union until 1979, when the HCSA also affiliated. It was the only TUC affiliated trade union party to medical negotiating machinery until 2016, when the HCSA also gained recognition.

When the medical negotiating machinery was set up in 1948 the BMA sought to exclude the MPU, because of its opposition to trade unionism. Following a campaign by the union, an agreement was reached between the BMA and the MPU in December 1950 as described in the General Medical Services Committee Report of September 1, 1951:

"Both the Conference of Local Medical Committees and the A.R.M of the B.M.A have agreed to the Committee's proposal that the constitution of the Committee should be altered so as to include two representatives of the Medical Practitioners' Union. The Union's two representatives, who have attended meetings of the Committee as observers during the past session, will in future have full Committee status."

The agreement, and the division between the two unions, is further referenced in preparatory notes for the Royal Commission on Doctors' and Dentists' Remuneration from 1958:

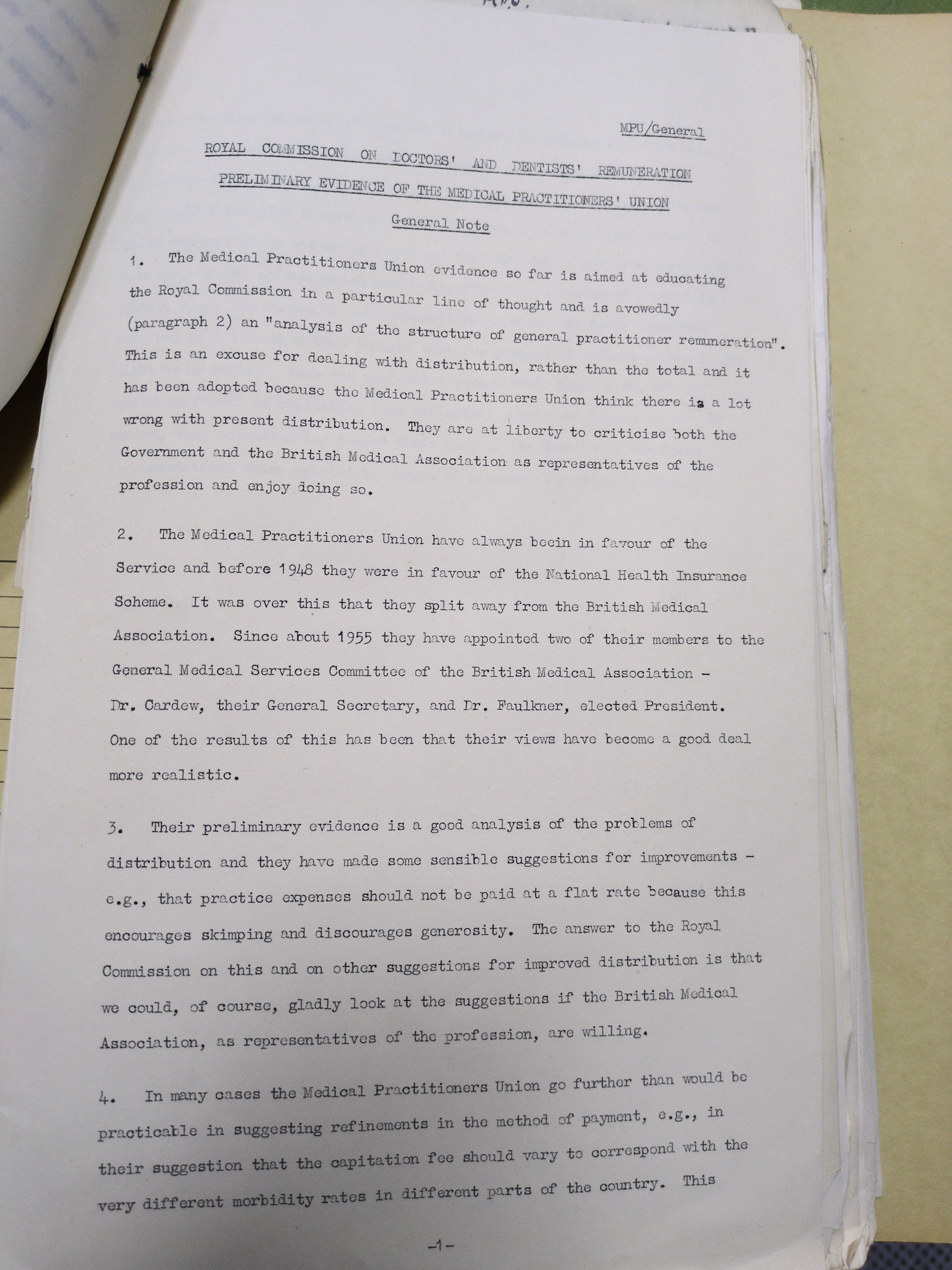
A civil service briefing note from 1958, explaining the relationship between the MPU and BMA at that time. National Archives, London.

"The Medical Practitioners Union have always been in favour of the Service and before 1948 they were in favour of the National Health Insurance Scheme. It was over this that they split away from the British Medical Association. Since about 1955 they have appointed two of their members to the General Medical Services Committee of the British Medical Association."

The BMA agreed to maintain universal franchise open to all doctors, including MPU members, and gave the MPU seats on the committee representing general practitioners. In return, the MPU withdrew its request for seats on the Doctors and Dentists Whitley Council. This is described in the Annual Report of Council 1950-51, published in the BMJ in March 1951. The report states that:

"The Council has considered a proposal by the General Medical Services Committee to provide a liaison between that Committee and the Medical Practitioners Union. The proposal originates in a claim put forward by the M.P.U for representation on the staff side of the Medical Whitley Council. The Committee, whilst not admitting the validity of the Union's claim for such direct representation, is anxious to ensure that the Minister is given no opportunity of consulting bodies other than those represented on the Whitley Council on major issues affecting general practitioners' terms and conditions of service under the National Health Service. It was felt, therefore, that it would be in the best interests of the profession if a solution could be found by friendly co-operation between the two bodies."

That agreement remains in force to this day, and is the means by which Unite accesses the negotiating machinery for doctors and hospital dentists in the NHS. The agreement also applied to local government from 1950 to 1974, when the NHS negotiating machinery extended to health workers in local government. As that is no longer the case, Unite is now the only recognised medical trade union in negotiations with local government.

Because of the MPU's unique position, significant number of BMA members who wish to be affiliated to the TUC maintain a dual membership with the MPU.

The recognition of the HCSA in 2016 led to a dispute about the negotiating machinery, which remains unresolved. The HCSA suggested a joint negotiating committee, with representatives from the HCSA and BMA. However, the BMA and Unite protested that the BMA machinery also represented Unite and (for hospital dentists) the British Dental Association. They stated that the most appropriate way for the HCSA to access negotiations would be by reaching a similar agreement to that of the MPU and the BMA. Failure to resolve this issue led to a situation in which the BMA, Unite and the BDA accessed negotiations through BMA machinery, whilst the HCSA met employers separately.

== Journal ==
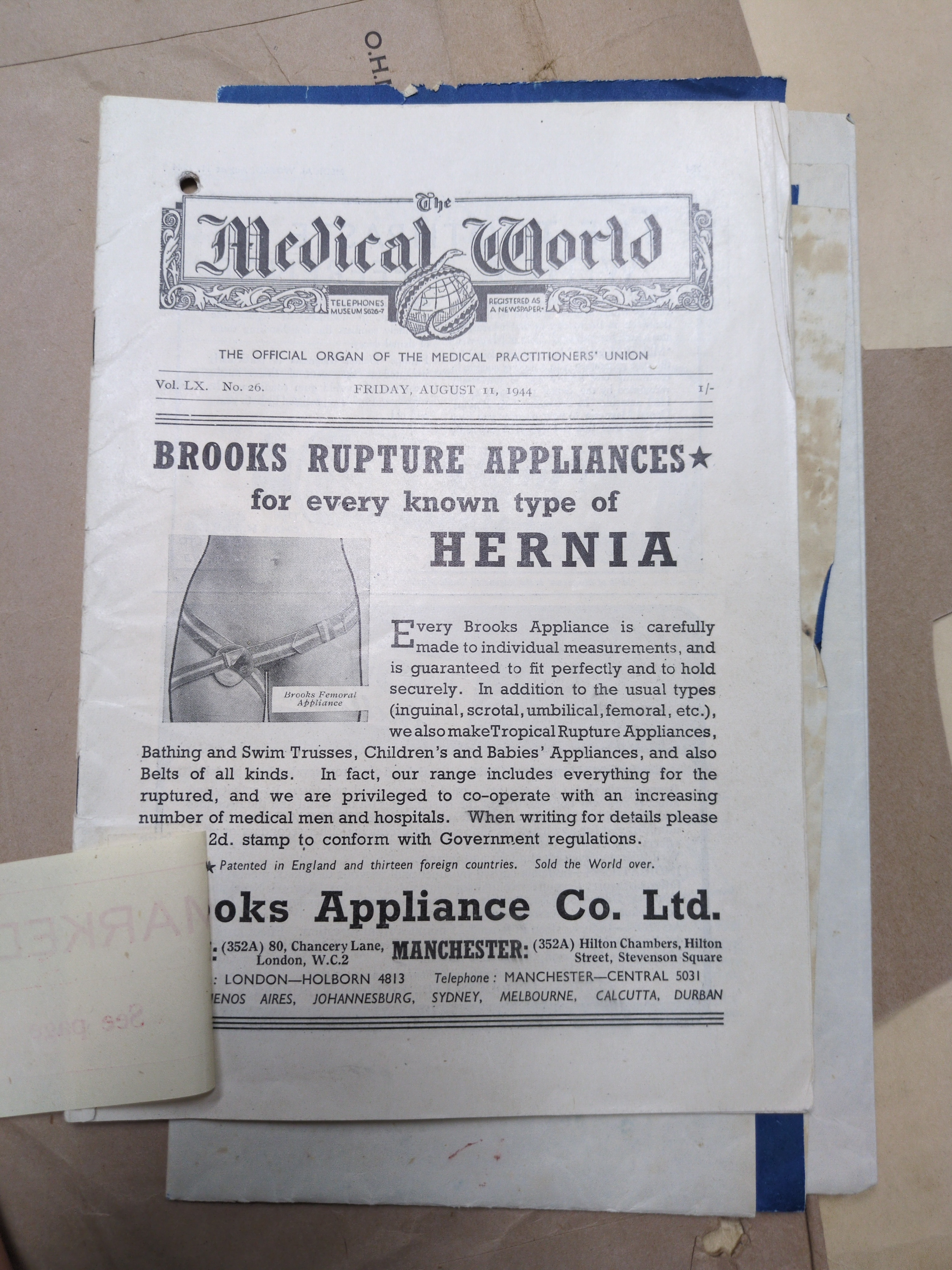
A copy of 'Medical World', published by the MPU, from 1944.

The union published the journal Medical World. This originated in 1913 as the official journal of the State Medical Service Association, and was adopted as the MPU's journal the following year.

== Aims ==
The union is committed to restoring the NHS as a publicly owned, publicly provided service which is democratically controlled, planned to meet need and serves as the means by which society pursues health as a social goal.

In a document published in its centenary year, entitled Caring for Doctors, Fighting for the NHS - Fighting for doctors, for health and for the people for over 100 years the MPU defined itself as:

- The campaigning medical union
- A progressive voice in the BMA
- Supporting grass roots voices in medicine
- The medical organisation for the people
- The medical policy think tank for health as a social goal
- The medical organisation for equality and diversity
- The organisation for doctors as health workers
- The only TUC affiliated union formally party to the BMA representative machinery
