= Horace Joules =

British physician, health administrator and health campaigner

Horace Joules LRCP, MRCP, MRCS, FRCP (21 March 1902 – 25 January 1977) was a British physician, health administrator and health campaigner, who played an important role in promoting public health and preventative medicine; particularly the link between cigarette smoking and lung cancer following the work of Richard Doll, Austin Bradford Hill, Ernst Wynder and Evarts Graham, and the adverse effects of air pollution.

== Early life and education ==
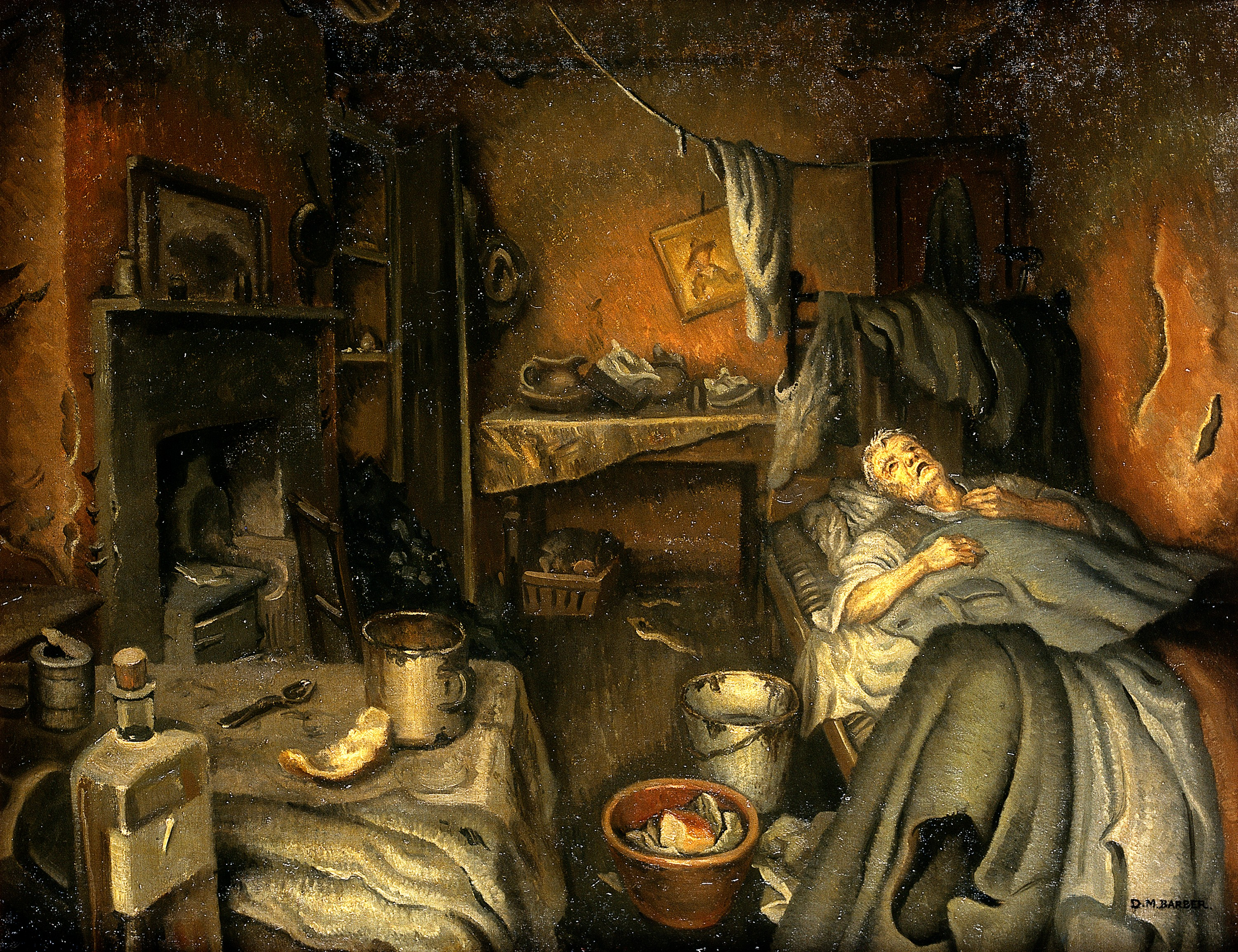
'A Patient at Home'. A painting by Dorothy Mary Barber commissioned by Horace Joules. The old man in the painting was a bronchitic and arthritic patient of the hospital: he lived in Harlesden. He was painted in his hospital bed, but the room was painted from outside the window of his dwelling, as the artist was deterred from entering by the smell.

Horace Joules was born at Woodseaves, High Offley Road, Newport, Shropshire, on 21 March 1902. He was the son of Richard Edgar Joules, a master grocer, and his wife, Emily Ann (née Hyatt), and one of ten children. His family were Primitive Methodists and his father was politically radical and a strict teetotaller. Joules was educated at Newport Grammar School before studying medicine at University College Cardiff and at Middlesex Hospital Medical School. He passed his medical degree in 1925, and in 1928 he achieved Membership of the Royal Colleges of Physicians and was awarded a Medicinae Doctor (MD) with a gold medal from the University of London.

== Career ==
After completion of his studies in 1925 Joules took up the posts of house physician at the Middlesex Hospital and Brompton Hospital. He was then appointed medical officer and registrar to the City of London Maternity Hospital and Middlesex Hospitals. In 1929 he left London to become resident physician to the Selly Oak Hospital, Birmingham. While at the Middlesex Hospital, Joules had been inspired by Somerville Hastings, surgeon in charge of the Ear and Throat Department, who was also chairman of the London County Council and subsequently became a Labour MP for Barking. It is likely that Somerville Hastings influenced Joule's socialist views, although Palladino has also suggested that Joules' left-wing politics also grew out of the strong Christian Socialist tradition in Britain. In 1930 Joules became a member of the newly formed Socialist Medical Association (SMA), and was influential in its subsequent development.

In 1935 Joules was appointed the first senior physician at the Central Middlesex County Hospital in north-west London. He remained active in political causes supporting the Spanish Medical Aid Committee to help the Republicans in the Spanish Civil War. Following the outbreak of World War II in 1939 Joules arranged for medical students from the Middlesex Hospital to be sent for clinical teaching at the Central Middlesex Hospital, and in 1940 he was made its Medical Superintendent. He was elected a Fellow of the Royal College of Physicians in 1943.

During and after the war he was a strong supporter of the creation of a National Health Service (NHS), and in 1948 he was appointed member of the North-west Metropolitan Regional Hospital Board and chairman of its medical committee. In the same year he was also appointed to the Central Health Services Council (CHSC), the main professional advisory body for the National Health Service, and two Standing Advisory Committees (the Standing Medical Advisory Committee (SMAC) and the Standing Advisory Cancer and Radiotherapy Committee (SAC(CR)). In 1950 he was also appointed to the Nursing Council. These positions gave him significant influence on health policy-making. Joules also played another indirect but important role in British Public Health at that period - in 1948 he invited Jerry Morris to base the Medical Research Council's Social Medicine Unit at the Central Middlesex Hospital, where it went on to undertake seminal studies on infant mortality and the role of physical exercise in heart disease. The unit was dissolved upon Morris's retirement in 1975 but by that time it had assembled a very influential team of epidemiologists and undertaken extensive research into chronic diseases and social medicine.

Joules' clinical specialty was lung disease. Tuberculosis (TB) was a major problem in the post-war period and Joules lobbied extensively to improve clinical services and was instrumental in opening two new hospital wards for tuberculosis at the Central Middlesex Hospital. This was at a time when many general hospitals refused admission to TB patients due to the perceived risk to staff. Joules instituted meticulous procedures of care that minimized the risk of infection, such that levels of TB were no higher in staff at the Central Middlesex than in other hospitals that refused to admit TB patients, and lower than the London teaching hospitals. He was also particularly concerned with dust disease (pneumoconiosis) in miners, especially those who developed chronic bronchitis but had no radiographic evidence of pneumoconiosis. In the absence of X-ray evidence of disease, miners received no compensation, an injustice which he fought hard to correct; however, it still remains a problem today.

Joules was also interested in the adverse effects of air pollution on health and, as vice-president of the SMA, established a special committee on 'Clean Air and Diseases of the Lung' in 1954, which included medical experts on industrial diseases, and representatives of the trade unions. This was highly topical since the Great Smog of December 1952 in London. This was estimated to have caused at least four thousand avoidable deaths. In 1953 in a letter on chronic bronchitis to the British Medical Journal he wrote:‘The air we breathe is as important as the water we drink. It must be uninfected and unpolluted.’ He urged the government to take action to control air pollution. Sir Hugh Beaver, chairman of Guinness Brewers and a member of the management committee of the Central Middlesex Hospital, was appointed to lead a parliamentary inquiry into the problem. Pressure from Joules helped provide evidence for the Beaver Committee. The Clean Air Bill that resulted became law in 1956 and smog gradually diminished in London and other British cities.

Around the same time, Joules became aware of the evidence linking cigarette smoking to lung cancer. Richard Doll had joined Francis Avery-Jones' Gastroenterology unit at Central Middlesex Hospital in 1948 to work on peptic ulcer disease and Joules was Medical Director of the Central Middlesex Hospital . In 1950 Doll began working with Austin Bradford Hill at the London School of Hygiene and Tropical Medicine on the possible link between cigarette smoking and lung cancer. Joules had been a heavy smoker for 30 years but after seeing Doll and Hill's results he became entirely convinced of the harmful effects of smoking. His father had died of lung cancer and he immediately stopped smoking himself and became a strident voice in the campaign against tobacco. Since Joules was a member of the CHSC, SAC(CR) and SMAC he was ideally placed to press the issue with the Ministry of Health. Still, he was often a lone voice speaking against tobacco and was opposed by many inside and outside of government. In 1952 an anonymous civil servant in the Ministry of Health wrote that:[Joules] ‘is as you know the main protagonist against smoking - on the CHSC, on the SAC(CR) and in the Press.’ Nevertheless, despite opposition from Sir Ernest Rock Carling, chair of the SAC(CR), he persuaded the Central Health Services Council to make the first official statement in Britain on the harmful effects of cigarette smoking. It is likely his contacts with the Labour Minister for Health, Hilary Marquand, and the recent death in February 1952 of King George VI, a heavy smoker, from a heart attack after an operation for lung cancer helped his case. Joules also energetically lobbied the Press, the Chief Medical Officer, and the Royal College of Physicians. In 1953 Joules was quoted in Parliament by the Labour MP, Harry Hynd as saying that: 'by 1965...unless something is done [about smoking], the number of deaths per annum [from lung cancer] will reach 25,000.' In 1954 Joules' appointment to SAC(CR) was not renewed - he had rocked the boat too much and his political views were unpalatable to the Conservative government that had been elected in 1951. His dismissal, along with those of Somerville Hastings, and David Stark Murray resulted in trade union protests, but these had no effect. Joules was replaced by Janet Aitken, who admitted to the Health Minister that: ‘I am not really an expert from a medical point of view in cancer and radiotherapy.’ Nevertheless, although Joules had been dropped from SAC(CR), he was still a member of the SMAC and he persuaded it to advise the Minister that it was ‘desirable that appropriate action should be taken constantly to inform the public of the known connection between smoking and cancer of the lung and of the risks involved in heavy smoking’. This was blocked by the CHSC in October 1955 who considered it would be ‘wise’ to await the outcome of further research, including that financed by the tobacco companies. Nevertheless, the tide of opinion was turning and in March 1956 the CHSC yielded to a further recommendation from the SMAC and advised that:

'Propaganda on smoking and lung cancer was becoming urgent...There was already sufficient evidence of a causal connection ...to justify a centrally directed propaganda campaign, for example through schools and general practitioners'.

Following this in 1956, the Ministry of Education revised its handbook on health education to include a section directing schools to instruct children on the relationship between cigarette smoking and lung cancer, and teachers were asked not to smoke in front of their students. Still, the government's position on smoking as a cause of lung cancer remained equivocal. In 1956 Joules established the first publicly funded clinic for smokers and in March 1957 Joules was again quoted in parliament by the Labour MP, Marcus Lipton, as saying 'that the health of our people is being sacrificed to the collection of £650 million annually from the tax on tobacco'. Eventually, following a special report on smoking and lung cancer in June 1957 by the Medical Research Council, the government conceded the issue, and the Minister of Health expressed unambiguous support for the conclusions reached by Doll and Hill, while at the same time saying that everyone would have to 'make up his mind, and must be relied upon as a responsible person to act as seems best'. Joules followed this by speaking to more than 250 children at a Croydon school and screening a film which showed a surgeon conducting an operation in which a cancer of the lung was removed. Joules also continued his campaign in the press. In 1958 he called for an increased tax on smoking and in 1959 he was reported in the Times as saying that the government's inaction could only mean that: 'we have become a nation of tobacco addicts. I wonder if there is any other drug addiction that the world has ever known that has produced such a pathetic harvest of disease.' Joules worked closely with Laurie Pavitt after his election as Labour Co-operative Member of Parliament for Willesden West in 1959 to keep up the pressure on the government. Pavitt introduced 17 bills on the control of tobacco, none of which were successful. In 1962, the Royal College of Physicians issued its famous report on Smoking and Health, which is now seen as a key milestone in tobacco control, and health education in general. Following its election, in 1965 the new Labour government passed a law prohibiting cigarette advertising on television and the public health campaign against tobacco entered its modern phase, but by this time Joules had retired.

Joules' campaigning on smoking was probably his most notable achievement, but he was also recognized as an outstanding clinician and teacher. In his obituary Ball recalls his Friday afternoon teaching rounds:

'He towered above all others in a characteristic pose, wagging his finger for emphasis. These occasions were immensely popular and 40 or 50 students would crowd round the beds. They were impressed by his gentleness, kindness to patients, his diagnostic skill, his fund of knowledge and his practical common sense. He thoroughly enjoyed the cut and thrust of teaching, and the students responded with fascination and delight.'

Joules also raised concerns about the risks of medical conflicts of interest, was critical of the effect of private beds on the NHS.

Joules also played an important role in the post-war peace movement. In 1951 at the height of the Korean War, he, along with six other eminent doctors, Richard Doll, Alfred Esterman, Ian Gilliland, Duncan Leys, Lionel Penrose, and Martin Pollock, wrote a letter expressing concern at the growing arms race and calling for doctors to work for peace and disarmament. This led to the founding of the Medical Association for the Prevention of War (MAPW). The first meeting was attended by 130 doctors and chaired by Joules. Subsequently, MAPW merged with the Medical Campaign Against Nuclear Weapons (MCANW) to form Medact.

University College London awards two annual Horace Joules Prizes in Respiratory Medicine and Public Health respectively to outstanding Medical Students.

== Personal life ==
Joules married Mary Sparrow in 1930; they had three sons (one of whom died) and a daughter. He was a keen gardener and bird watcher, with a liking for John Clare, the poet and natural philosopher. In 1962 he took early retirement due to poor mental health and moved to Colchester, Essex; Joules had suffered from bipolar disorder since the second world war. He died on 25 January 1977 and was cremated at Colchester crematorium on 30 January 1977. On 24 April 1968 the Central Middlesex Hospital opened a residency, teaching laboratory and lecture theater, named Horace Joules Hall in his honour. A one-day conference on 'Progress in the prevention of chest disease in memory of Horace Joules' was also held at the Avery Jones Postgraduate Centre of the Central Middlesex Hospital, London, on 27 January 1978.

Christopher Freeman, a former member of the Communist Party who traveled with Joules to the Soviet Union in 1952, described Joules as an 'ethical' and 'humane' person, not particularly interested in matters of political theory (cited in).

In his obituary, the Times described him as 'one of the stormy petrels of the early days of the National Health Service [...] His pen and his voice, both of which he could use with facility and abrasiveness all too often did him and his cause a disservice.’ However, Ball in his obituary described him as 'a fighter [if] he saw anything he considered wrong, either in the abuse of power or of vested interests... But fierce battle in committee never led to personal antagonism or rancour; many who disagreed with him publicly came to appreciate his warmth and friendship in private.'.

== Bibliography ==
- Joules H. The doctor's view of war. London,: G. Allen & Unwin ltd.; 1938.
- Joules H. The Psychological Approach to the Patient. London: Institute of Certified Ambulance Personnel; 1948.
- Joules H. Gilliland I, Barber M. British Doctors in Russia. London: H. K. Lewis & Co. Ltd.; 1952.
- Joules H. Stop that cough!: a study of preventable bronchitis. London; 1953.
