= Jerry Morris =

Scottish epidemiologist (1910–2009)

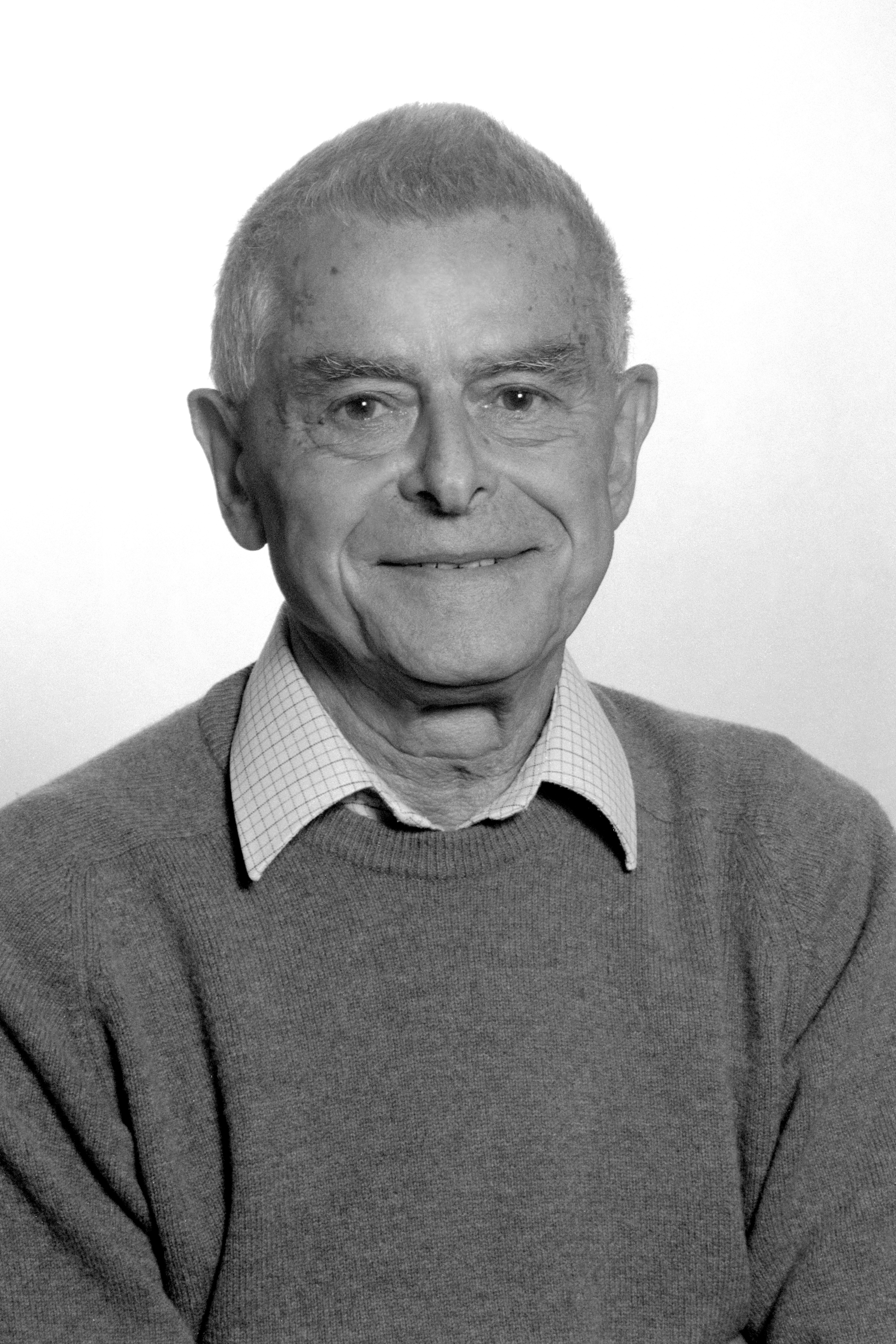
Jerry Morris

Jeremiah Noah Morris (6 May 1910 – 28 October 2009) was a Scottish epidemiologist who established the importance of physical activity in preventing cardiovascular disease.

== Early life ==
Morris was born on 6 May 1910 in Liverpool. His Jewish family had emigrated to escape pogroms in Poland. Arriving by boat in Liverpool, the family adopted the surname of the ship's captain. His family moved to Glasgow, where Jerry was brought up in poverty. His childhood experiences of Glasgow's slums informed his later work, and led to his membership of the Labour Party which he joined at the age 16, and only left when in his nineties in his disgust at the Second Gulf War. In his interview with Max Blythe, Morris notes that he once had rickets and signs of the disease were evident into adulthood, and stated that rickets were an indicator of poverty.

He earned his undergraduate degree at the University of Glasgow and was awarded his medical degree in 1934 at University College London Medical School. During his time at UCLH, Morris was taught by Thomas Lewis and later became his house physician for six months.

In 1946, two years after his discharge from the RAMC, Morris went to the London School of Hygiene & Tropical Medicine to complete a diploma in public health.

== Research ==
World map of cardiovascular disease, 2004.

Morris was perhaps the first person to analyse data on cardiovascular disease and physical activity at scale. By performing a large scale survey, he first noticed in 1949 that the sedentary drivers of London's double-decker buses had higher rates of cardiovascular disease than the conductors who climbed the stairs. He extended the study and noticed that postmen who delivered the mail by bike or on foot had fewer heart attacks than sedentary men who served behind counters or as telephonists and clerks.

He performed further studies that showed slow movements such as gardening helped very little, and exercise had to be more vigorous to help. After several more years of study, he published the seminal paper on the topic in the British Medical Journal in 1958, titled Coronary Heart Disease and Physical Activity of Work. His findings were presented at the 1958 Ernestine Henry Lecture.

== Career ==
Jerry Morris was an early proponent of acting on what are now recognized as the social determinants of health. In 1948 Horace Joules invited him to base the Medical Research Council's Social Medicine Research Unit at the Central Middlesex Hospital, where it went on to undertake seminal studies on infant mortality and the role of physical exercise in heart disease. From the late 60s to early 70s the unit focused mostly on cardiovascular disease. His association with social scientists Richard Titmuss and Brian Abel-Smith, both at the London School of Economics (LSE), influenced health policy development under the UK's Labour governments of the 1960s. A member of numerous health advisory bodies, from the first Royal College of Physicians committee on smoking and air pollution in the 1950s to the Black Committee on Inequalities in Health in 1979, his most recent and final published work was on the minimum income required for healthy living. He played a key role in forming the Faculty of Community Medicine (now Public Health) of the Royal Colleges of Physicians of the United Kingdom.

In 1967 Jerry Morris joined the London School of Hygiene and Tropical Medicine (LSHTM), bringing with him the MRC's Social Medicine Research Unit. His textbook Uses of Epidemiology (1957) influenced public health education and the development of prevention strategies for the control of non-communicable diseases throughout much of the world. In 1970, he launched the MSc in Social Medicine at LSHTM, delivered jointly by faculty from LSHTM and LSE.

At the Olympic Games in 1996 he was honoured with an Olympic gold medal in recognition of excellence in the science of sport and exercise, and pioneering studies into how exercise reduces the rate of heart disease. On retirement he was recognized as Emeritus Professor of Public Health at LSHTM. He died on 28 October 2009, at the age of 99 years.

A giant in the field, he influenced the career paths of public health practitioners in several countries, a number of whom he personally mentored. A witness seminar held on 21 July 2000 at LSHTM celebrated his 90th birthday. A record of this event, with presentations by Michael Marmot, Roger Bannister and other experts, was published in association with the proceedings of a conference on Epidemiology, Social Medicine and Public Health. A survey of Jerry Morris's contribution to public health has also been published.
