= Hugh Faulkner (doctor) =

Hugh Faulkner (22 September 1912 – 19 April 1994) was a communist doctor who practised in North London. He was a significant figure in both the Medical Practitioners' Union and the Socialist Health Association, and a key figure in the development of the 1966 Doctor's Charter. He retired to Italy where he continued his political activities.

Diagnosed with cancer of the pancreas in 1987, he adopted a macrobiotic diet and survived a further seven years. He wrote a book about his experiences, Physician Heal Thyself, The Cancer Prevention Diet and lectured on the subject.
