= Alex Scott-Samuel =

British academic and political advisor

Alex Scott-Samuel is a British retired lecturer in public health at the University of Liverpool, where he was the director of the International Health Impact Assessment Consortium. He is the chair of Wavertree Constituency Labour Party and has a seat on the Labour Party regional board for the northwest. He was the chair of the Socialist Health Association between 2017 and 2020 and is involved in the Keep Our NHS Public movement.

== Career ==
Until his retirement in late 2015, Scott-Samuel was a senior lecturer in public health and policy at the University of Liverpool. He has published on topics related to health impact assessment, health inequalities, gender inequality and the politics of health. In 1979 he established a politics of health journal, which later became Critical Public Health. Later he established the UK Politics of Health Group.

In 2014, he was the joint author of a paper published in the International Journal of Health Services which claimed that the policies of Margaret Thatcher's government had led to the "unnecessary and unjust premature death of many British citizens, together with a substantial and continuing burden of suffering and loss of well-being". In 2015 he described Simon Stevens, Chief Executive of NHS England as the "cheerleader-in-chief for NHS privatisation".

He supported the campaign to preserve the independence of Liverpool Women's Hospital, saying that the proposal to move it was part of the government plans to cut services and eventually privatise them.

In 2017, he stood for election to the Momentum executive, and said that he was "an adviser to Labour's shadow health minister". At the 2017 Labour Party Conference, he proposed a motion on health policy on behalf of the Socialist Health Association calling for the reinstatement of the NHS "as per the NHS Bill (2016-17)". It was carried unanimously.

Scott-Samuel submitted a motion of no confidence in former Labour MP Luciana Berger, which was subsequently withdrawn after Tom Watson called for the Wavertree party to be suspended.

Articles in The Economist and The Times as well as The Jewish Chronicle have called Scott-Samuel a conspiracy theorist. Both Wes Streeting and Alex Sobel called for his expulsion from the Labour party on this basis.

== Personal life ==
According to the constituency party, Scott-Samuel is Jewish.

== Publications ==
- Health impact assessment – theory into practice, Journal of Epidemiology and Community Health, 1998
- The Merseyside Guidelines for Health Impact Assessment, IMPACT, 2001 ISBN 1 874038 56 2
- Towards a politics of health, with Clare Bambra and D Fox, in Health promotion international 2005
- Suicides associated with the 2008–10 economic recession in England: time trend analysis, with Ben Barr, David Taylor-Robinson, Martin McKee and David Stuckler, British Medical Journal, 2012
- Health and environmental impact assessment: an integrated approach, British Medical Journal, 2013
- Personal Health Budgets in England: Mood Music or Death Knell for the National Health Service?, International Journal of Health Services, 2015
- After a summer of crisis and opportunity, can Labour's progressive NHS policies be sustained?, Open Democracy, 2016
- Peter Draper obituary, The Guardian, 2016
- The NHS has become simply a logo for a partially privatised system – and the roots of the change go back to Davos, Labour List, 3 June 2017
