= Chloe Orkin =

British physician

Chloe Orkin MBE FRCP
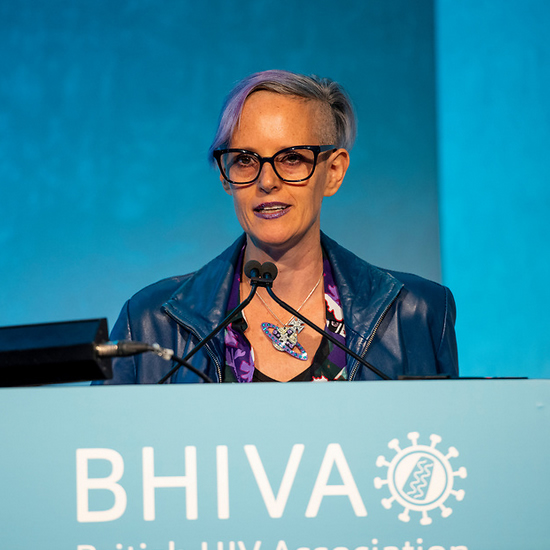
- Born: Johannesburg; South Africa
- Education: University of the Witwatersrand; London School of Hygiene & Tropical Medicine
- Known for: Management of HIV/AIDS
- Partner: Flick Thorley
- Scientific career
- Workplaces: Queen Mary University of London; Barts Health NHS Trust; Chelsea and Westminster Hospital
- Website: https://www.qmul.ac.uk/blizard/all-staff/profiles/chloe-orkin.html

Chloe Meave Orkin is a British physician and Professor of HIV/AIDS medicine at Queen Mary University of London. She works as a consultant at the Royal London Hospital, Barts Health NHS Trust. She is an internationally renowned expert in HIV therapeutics and led the first phase III clinical trial of injectable anti-retrovirals. She is immediate past chair of the British HIV Association, where she championed the Undetectable=Untransmittable (U=U) campaign within the United Kingdom. She is president elect of the Medical Women's Federation. Orkin is gay and was on the Top 100 Lesbian influencer lists in both the UK and in the US in 2020. She considers herself a medical activist and much of her work focuses on inequalities in healthcare and in Medicine.

== Early life and education ==
Orkin was born in Johannesburg, South Africa. She obtained her medical degree in 1995 from the University of the Witwatersrand and was the prize student in virology and microbiology. She began her clinical training at Chris Hani Baragwanath Hospital, Soweto in the 1990s. At the time, between 30 and 40% of medical inpatients were infected with HIV and Orkin herself, lost close friends to AIDS. She moved to the United Kingdom. In 1998, she completed her specialist training in HIV and Genitourinary Medicine at Chelsea and Westminster Hospital. Towards the end of her specialist training, Orkin moved to Botswana together with nurse colleague and partner Flick Thorley to establish an HIV/AIDS treatment programme in Francistown as part of the government anti-retroviral roll-out. In 2006, Orkin completed a MSc in Infectious Diseases from The London School of Hygiene & Tropical Medicine.

== Research and career ==
At the age of 29, Orkin was appointed as consultant physician at Barts Health NHS Trust. Her specialist interests are the development of novel antiretroviral therapies, blood-borne virus testing and health inequalities. In 2013, she led the Test Me East HIV testing campaign which was supported by David Furnish, Sir Elton John and Sadie Frost and covered by CNN, Channel 4 and ITV news. In 2015, she spearheaded 'Going Viral', a week-long campaign to raise awareness of blood-borne viruses. The week-long novel campaign offered HIV, Hepatitis B and Hepatitis C testing in emergency departments around the United Kingdom utilising an opt-out testing strategy. The campaign was widely covered in the media and supported by several high profile celebrities, including actor Richard Wilson and DJ Tim Westwood.

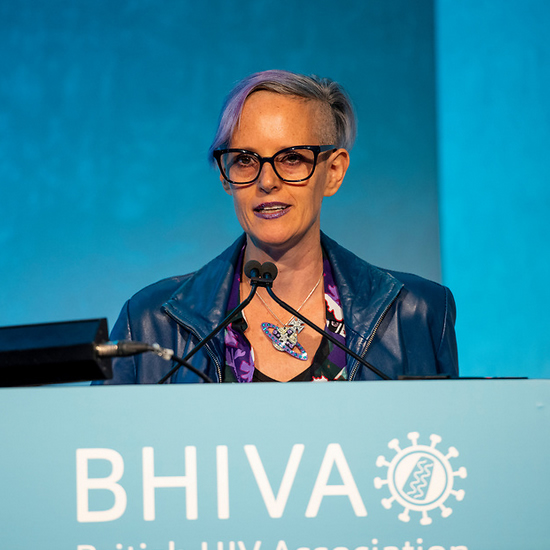
Chloe Orkin presenting at annual British HIV Association Conference (2019)

She led the first ever phase III clinical trial into the use of injectable anti-retrovirals. After appearing on ITV News to discuss the treatment, she was trolled on social media where many misogynistic and homophobic comments were made about her appearance and sexual identity. This experience led her to take action on gender and sexuality-based discrimination. Shortly after she stood for election and was elected Vice President of the Medical Women's Federation in 2019. Orkin has also served as Chair of the British HIV Association from 2017-2019 and is on the Governing Council for the International AIDS Society.

In 2018, Orkin and the British HIV Association announced their commitment to the Undetectable=Untransmittable (U=U) campaign.

During the first wave of COVID-19 pandemic in the United Kingdom, she led on safe delivery of COVID-19 treatment trials at the 5 Barts Health NHS Trust hospitals including NHS Nightingale London (the first non-hospital, non-military research delivery). Since then she has led the team that created a new clinical trial centre in a community library to deliver a large SARS CoV2 vaccine trials and was appointed as its clinical director. She has also led research into poor health outcomes in ethnically diverse people and on gender disparities in women's academic careers. She is lead investigator for the first COVID-19 vaccine trial in pregnant women.

== Selected publications ==
HIV Anti-retroviral Therapy:

- Orkin C, et al. (March 2020). "Long-Acting Cabotegravir and Rilpivirine after Oral Induction for HIV-1 Infection". NEJM. 382, 12 (1): 1124–1135. doi:10.1056/NEJMoa1909512. PMID 32130806.
- Orkin C, et al. (June 2020). "Fixed-dose combination bictegravir, emtricitabine, and tenofovir alafenamide versus dolutegravir-containing regimens for initial treatment of HIV-1 infection: week 144 results from two randomised, double-blind, multicentre, phase 3, non-inferiority trials". The Lancet HIV. 7 (6): E389–E400. doi:10.1016/S2352-3018(20)30099-0. hdl:1805/26562. PMID 32504574. S2CID 219528364.
- Orkin C, et al. (February 2019). "Doravirine/Lamivudine/Tenofovir Disoproxil Fumarate is Non-inferior to Efavirenz/Emtricitabine/Tenofovir Disoproxil Fumarate in Treatment-naive Adults With Human Immunodeficiency Virus-1 Infection: Week 48 Results of the DRIVE-AHEAD Trial". Clinical Infectious Diseases. 68 (4): 535–544. doi:10.1093/cid/ciy540. PMC 6355823. PMID 30184165.
- Orkin C, et al. (May 2017). "Switching from tenofovir disoproxil fumarate to tenofovir alafenamide coformulated with rilpivirine and emtricitabine in virally suppressed adults with HIV-1 infection: a randomised, double-blind, multicentre, phase 3b, non-inferiority study". The Lancet HIV. 4 (5): E195–E204. doi:10.1016/S2352-3018(17)30031-0. PMID 28259777.
- Orkin C, et al. (March 2020). "Once-daily Doravirine in Human Immunodeficiency Virus Type 1-Infected, Antiretroviral-naive Adults: An Integrated Efficacy Analysis". Clinical Infectious Diseases. 70 (7): 1344–1352. doi:10.1093/cid/ciz424. PMID 31121015.
- Orkin C, et al. (April 2020). "Week 96 results of a phase 3 trial of darunavir/cobicistat/emtricitabine/tenofovir alafenamide in treatment-naive HIV-1 patients". AIDS. 34 (5): 707–718. doi:10.1097/QAD.0000000000002463. hdl:2445/173691. PMID 31833849.

COVID-19 Equality Research:

- Apea VJ, Wan YI, Dhairyawan R, Puthucheary ZA, Pearse RM, Orkin CM, Prowle JR (January 2021). "Ethnicity and outcomes in patients hospitalised with COVID-19 infection in East London: an observational cohort study". BMJ Open. 11 (1) e042140. doi:10.1136/bmjopen-2020-042140. ISSN 2044-6055. PMC 7813387. PMID 33455936.
- Cevik M, Haque SA, Manne-Goehler J, Kuppalli K, Sax PE, Majumder MS, Orkin C (January 2021). "Gender disparities in COVID-19 clinical trial leadership". Clinical Microbiology and Infection. 27 (7): 1007–1010. doi:10.1016/j.cmi.2020.12.025. PMC 7785275. PMID 33418021.

Blood-borne Virus Testing in UK Emergency Department:

- Parry S, Bundle N, Ullah S, Foster G, Ahmad K, Tong W, Balasegaram S, Orkin C (June 2018). "Implementing routine blood-borne virus testing for HCV, HBV and HIV at a London Emergency Department - uncovering the iceberg?". Epidemiology and Infection. 146 (8): 1026–1035. doi:10.1017/S0950268818000870. PMC 9184937. PMID 29661260.

== Awards and honours ==
Orkin is a Fellow of the Royal College of Physicians (FRCP).

== Personal life ==
Orkin is a lesbian. She lives in London with her wife Flick Thorley, who was a highly regarded HIV specialist nurse at Chelsea and Westminster hospital and Charge Nurse at the London Lighthouse. They share a home with their three dogs and two cats.
