= Ernestine Henry Lecture =

Lecture at the Royal College of Physicians

- Established: 1949
- Faculty: Royal College of Physicians

The Ernestine Henry Lecture is a talk based on occupation hazards, delivered every three years. It was endowed to the Royal College of Physicians in London, in 1949 by British physician Sydney Alexander Henry, in memory of his mother Ernestine Henry, the wife of a General Practitioner in Rochdale, Lancashire. It is now delivered as part of the Faculty of Occupational Medicine/Society of Occupational Medicine annual conference "Occupational Health"

== Lecturers ==
Years	Name	Lecture title	Notes	Image
1949	Donald Hunter	"Devices for the protection of the worker against injury and disease"		
1952	Ronald E. Lane	"Blood changes in industrial disease"		
1955	Kenneth M. A. Perry	"Pulmonary disease associated with metallic oxides"		
1958	Jerry N. Morris	"Coronary heart disease and occupation"		
1961	John Morrison Barnes	"The mode of action of some toxic substances with special reference to the effects of prolonged exposure"		
1964	R. C. Browne	"Coal miner's nystagmus - psyche and soma"		
1967	Georgiana Bonser	"Factors concerned in the location of human and experimental tumours"		
1970	Richard Selwyn Francis Schilling	"Hazards of deep-sea fishing"		
1973	F. S. Cooksey	"Concerning the management of chronic and progressive disability"		
1976	E. P. G. H. Du Boulay	"Radiation hazards"		
1979	P. C. Elms	"The relative importance of cigarette smmoking in occupational lung disease"		
1983	K. W. Donald	"Diver's diseases"		
1990	J. M. Harrington	"The health of health care workers"		
1996	David Coggon	"New occupational diseases"		
1999	Robert Ian McCallum	"The industrial toxicology of antimony"		
2011	Sir Michael Marmot			
2024	Gary J. Macfarlane	Musculoskeletal Health and Work		
