= Charles Wortham Brook =

London GP and member of the LCC

Charles Wortham Brook CBE (1901–1983) was a London GP and an elected member of the London County Council.

He was born in Lincoln into a comfortably established middle-class family of Tory views. His father was an ophthalmologist. He was secretary of the Cambridge University Socialist Society. He married Iris Beynon, a nurse while he was training at St Bartholomew's Hospital.

He qualified as a medical practitioner in 1925. He wrote to the Daily Herald in 1930 inviting doctors "who might be interested in forming a body of socialist doctors" to contact him. This led to the foundation of the Socialist Medical Association in 1930 and he became its secretary, serving until 1938. He is credited with being the main architect of the Spanish Medical Aid Committee.

He was a co-founder of the Royal College of General Practitioners in 1952.

He lived at Mottingdeane, High Road, Mottingham, London, SE9.

== Publications ==
- Battling Surgeon. A life of Thomas Wakley. 1945
- Carlile and the surgeons 1943
- Making Medical History 1946
