= Melson =

Melson and its variant spelling Milson are English, patronymic surnames.

Notable people with the surname include:

- Boyd Melson (born 1981), American boxer
- C. W. Melson (1929–1981), American politician
- Charles L. Melson (1904–1981), American admiral
- Christoffer Aagaard Melson (born 1984), Danish politician
- Isaac Melson Meekins (1875–1946), U.S. federal judge
- Joe Melson (born 1935), American singer and songwriter
- Juanita Melson (1940s–2017), Singaporean radio personality
- Kenneth E. Melson (born c. 1948), American lawyer and acting ATF Director
- Robert Melson (political scientist) (born 1937), American political scientist
- Silas Melson (born 1996), American basketball player
- Tim Melson (born 1960), American politician
