= Janet Mary Campbell =

British physician and medical officer

Janet Mary Campbell DBE JP
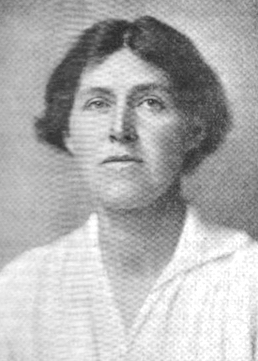
- Janet Mary Campbell, from a 1924 publication.
- Born: 5 March 1877; Brighton, England
- Died: 27 September 1954 (aged 77); London, England
- Occupations: Physician, medical officer

Dame Janet Mary Campbell DBE JP (5 March 1877 – 27 September 1954) was a British physician and medical officer. Active in refugee relief, Campbell assisted orphaned Basque children following the fascist bombings of the Basque region of Spain, particularly Guernica, during the Spanish Civil War.

== Early life ==
Janet Mary Campbell was born in Brighton, the daughter of George Campbell, and Mary Letitia Rowe. Her father was a Scottish bank manager. She earned her medical degree in 1904, after study at the London School of Medicine for Women.

== Career ==
Campbell worked as a surgeon at the Royal Free Hospital and the Belgrave Hospital for Children early in her career. She served as Senior Medical Officer for Maternity and Child Welfare at the Ministry of Health and, from 1907, Chief Woman Medical Adviser to the Board of Education. She helped in preparing the 1923 Hadow Report, Differentiation of the curriculum for boys and girls respectively in secondary schools. She took particular interest in maternal death, vaccination, and child protection. In 1927, she gave a course of lectures at the King's College, London, on "Maternal Mortality", saying "We need more study and better investigation into the cause of this tragedy". She suggested subsidised midwifery services and postnatal clinics as two possible measures.

Campbell visited Australia in 1929, to consult on maternal and child health policy. In 1934 she married and had to resign her civil service job. In 1937, she assisted orphaned Basque children following the fascist bombings of the Basque region of Spain, particularly Guernica, during the Spanish Civil War. In 1938, she chaired the Public Health Committee of the International Council of Women, presenting a report on malnutrition.

Campbell served on the Health Committee of the League of Nations. During World War II, she was a member of the War Cabinet's Committee of Women in Industry. Campbell was a founding member of the Medical Women's Federation, and served a term as the federation's president from 1944 to 1946. She was a justice of the peace in Surrey and Gloucestershire.

== Personal life ==
Campbell married the civil servant Michael Heseltine, registrar of the General Medical Council, in 1934. He died in 1952. She died in 1954 in London at the age of 77.

== Honours ==
- DBE (1924 Birthday Honours)
- Honorary Degree, University of Durham (1924)

== Selected bibliography of writings by Campbell ==
- Midwives and Midwifery. Voluntary work for infant welfare. Play centres and playgrounds (Carnegie United Kingdom Trust. Report on the Physical Welfare of Mothers and Children. England and Wales, vol. 2; 1917)
- The training of midwives, (Great Britain. Ministry of Health. Reports on public health and medical subjects; 1923)
- Notes on the arrangements for teaching obstetrics and gynæcology in the medical schools (1923)
- Maternal mortality (Reports on public health and medical subjects; 1924)
- The protection of motherhood (British Ministry of Health reports on public health and medical subjects; 1927)
- Infant mortality; international inquiry of the Health organisation of the League of nations, English section (1929)
- Report on Maternal and Child Welfare in Australia (papers presented to Parliament/Session 1929–31, volume 2; 1930)
- National Health Services and Preventive Methods for improving National Health (1943)
