= David Stark Murray =

British pathologist

David Stark Murray (14 July 1900 – 16 September 1977), son of Robert Murray MP was British a consultant pathologist, writer, and president of the Socialist Medical Association 1951–70. He was active in campaigning for the establishment of the British National Health Service.

He was born at 244 Main Street, Barrhead, Scotland, and qualified in 1925 from Glasgow University. He came to London in 1927 as pathologist to the Lambeth Hospital under the Board of Guardians. He lived at 33 Murray Road, Northwood, London. Then followed appointments as Consulting Pathologist to the Royal Hospital Richmond and other hospitals in the area, Group Pathologist in the Emergency Medical Service (1939) at Kingston, Surrey and from 1948, under the NHS, Group Pathologist, Kingston Hospital until his retirement in 1965. He established laboratories at Richmond and Kingston and the central sterile supplies department at Kingston Hospital. He was Chairman of the Blood Transfusion Service of the South West Metropolitan Region of the NHS. He was president of the Surrey Branch of the British Medical Association.

In October 1962 he went to the University of Chicago to talk to students about the fight for socialized medicine.

For many years he edited the Socialist Doctor, Medicine Today and Tomorrow, and Socialism and Health. He wrote innumerable articles on the health service under his own name and under pseudonyms, specially that of Irwin Brown.

== Publications ==
- The Laboratory: its Place in the Modern World 1934
- Science Fights Death 1936
- Your Body: How it is Built and How it Works, London, Watts & Co., 1936
- Health for all V. Gollancz, 1942.
- The Future Of Medicine Penguin 1942
- Your Health, Mr. Smith 1946
- Now for Health with L. C. J. McNae St Botolph Publishing 1946
- The anatomy of man and other animals, or, brothers under the skin 1951
- Medical Care and Family Security (with Karl Evang, and Walter Jay Lear) Prentice-Hall, 1963
- India—which Century? Gollancz, 1967
- Why a National Health Service? Pemberton Books 1971
- Medical Care: Who gets the best service? Fabian Society 1971
- Blueprint for Health Schocken Books, 1974
- Health for 1000 Million People: Health Care Today in China and Russia (with Joan Sohn-Rethel) Socialist Medical Association 1977
