= Medical Women's Federation =

- Abbreviation: MWF
- Predecessor: Association of Registered Medical Women
- Formation: 1 February 1917; 109 years ago
- Legal status: Charity
- Location: Tavistock House North, Tavistock Square, London
- Coordinates: 51.526403°N 0.128015°W
- Region served: United Kingdom
- Members: 1200 (2008)
- Current President: Jane Dacre
- Key people: Previous Presidents of the MWF who have Wikipedia pages are listed here.
- Website: www.medicalwomensfederation.org.uk

The Medical Women's Federation is the largest UK body of women doctors. The organisation is dedicated to the advancement of the personal and professional development of women in medicine and to improving the health of women and their families in society. It was founded in 1917, and its headquarters are located in Tavistock Square, London.

== Origins ==
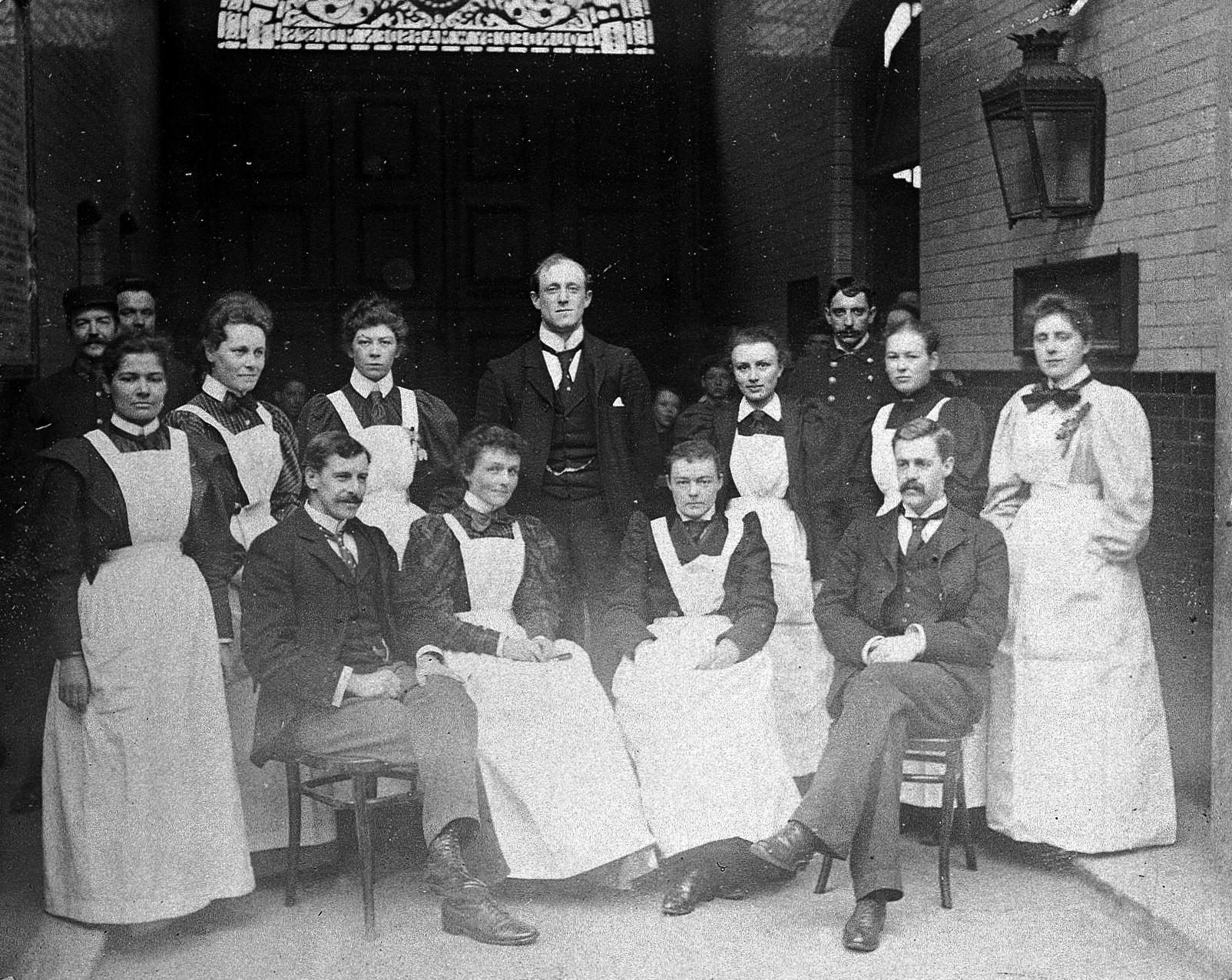
Late 19th century Group photo of the Medical Women's Federation

The Medical Women's Foundation built upon the Association of Registered Medical Women, which had been founded in London in 1879 with the intention that it would 'speak on behalf of all medical women and represent their interests.' Nine members comprised the original association, though other provincial associations and members rapidly followed as more women became qualified in medicine. Representatives of these associations came together in 1916 to discuss the benefits of establishing a Federation. This meeting was in part stimulated by the Government's dismissive attitude towards women doctors who wished to serve in the First World War.

On 1 February 1917, Articles of Association were drawn up and signed, thus creating the Medical Women's Federation. There were 190 members to begin with, including Jane Harriett Walker, Ethel Williams, Catherine Chisholm, Florence Barrett, and Louisa Aldrich-Blake. The offices opened on 13 February. At the outset they considered accepting members living outside the British Isles and reported receiving enquiries from Canada, Tasmania, Australia and India.

The newly formed Federation launched a campaign to promote the role of women in the armed forces, arguing that women medics should be given commissions in order to maintain discipline in military hospitals. Concerns about women included fears about their physical abilities and the absence of suitable accommodation, and especially the attitude that women should not command men and fear that any concession might initiate a movement for officer-status on the behalf of other women serving in branches of the military. The Federation collected testimonies and excellent records, but despite their petitioning and campaigning the War Office remained reluctant to grant women equal status.

Other early focusses included venereal disease, prostitution, and maternity and infant welfare.

== Inter-war years ==
In the 1920s, the Federation was concerned about the number of organisations which restricted access to women, including medical schools, local authorities and other employers. Several medical schools had reverted to refusing women access, and many organisations had marriage bars. An early campaign of the Federation included a 1918 protest against London County Council's decision to return to a pre-war refusal to employ married women. A standing committee on Married Medical Women followed in 1921. By the 1930s, Stepney and the city of York had appointed women Medical Officers of Health.

In addition to their work on the employment of women, the Federation examined varied aspects of women's health during the inter-war years. Issues included venereal disease, nutrition, lunacy law reform, the fitness of women to pilot commercial aeroplanes, the menopause, and guidance on the hygiene of menstruation (a Federation pamphlet on this subject sold 10,000 copies in a single year). In 1921, the Association of Medical Women in India became affiliated to the Federation, and the improvement of women's health in India was a Federation campaign. Another particular focus during this period was sexual health. In 1921, a subcommittee was appointed to discuss birth control, a topic that was much discussed at the time in light of the campaigning of Marie Stopes. In 1930, Dr Margaret Ida Balfour published research into maternity care of mill-workers in Bombay, India. By 1931, a resolution was passed stating that instruction in the provision of birth control should be included in medical schools' gynaecological syllabus. They also argued that the Birth Control Investigation Committee ought to include a woman gynaecologist.

== Second World War ==
Before the outbreak of the Second World War, the Federation and War Office discussed the role that women would play in the conflict. They decided that women were to receive the same rates of pay as their male counterparts, and the same allowances as single men doctors. However, the Federation were unsuccessful in their efforts to obtain the right for women to be commissioned personnel, and women were only granted "relative rank".

The Federation achieved several successes in terms of incorporating their concerns into government policy during the war. Women served on a number of medical boards and panels of consultants, though not on the Ministry of Labour's staff. The federation also lobbied government on issues including equal pay, the birth rate, nursery school provision, and the employment of women in the Diplomatic Services. In 1944, the Goodenough committee strongly advocated changes to medicine including mixed medical schools and called for open competition for all hospital appointments. Its criticism of discrimination against women in hospitals as going against public interest was significant in furthering the aims of the Federation.

== Post-war work ==
From the end of the Second World War, the Federation played an increasingly influential role in British Medicine due to its representation on other medical bodies. In 1946, British Medical Association appointed its first women members, and throughout the 1950s and 60s Federation members worked with the BMA and the General Medical Council as well as other official committees.

The Federation also made connections with other women's organisations such as the Women's Group on Public Welfare. These connections led to work such as the creation of the Women's National Cancer Control Campaign in 1963, studies into ovarian cancer, and campaigning against female genital mutilation.

In addition to long-standing campaigns to address workplace or educational grievances of women medics, campaign issues after the war included: nursery arrangements, care of the child under the NHS, pain in childbirth, the health of schoolgirls, family planning in the National Health Service, abortion, rape and sexual assault, assisted reproduction, and child health.

In 1970, the organisation became eligible for charitable status and was registered on 16 November as the Medical Women's Federation Grant Fund. It is now registered with the Charity commission under its own name.

In 2008 the organisation reported having 1,200 members.

== Presidents ==
1917–1920 Jane Harriett Walker

1920–1922 Mary Sturge
1922–1924 Florence Barrett
1924–1926 Frances Ivens
1926–1928 Christine Murrell
1928–1930 Catherine Chisholm
1930–1932 Louisa Martindale
1932–1934 Mabel L. Ramsay
1934–1936 Ethel Williams
1936 Mona Chalmers Watson
1936–1938 Ellen Orr
1938–1940 Elizabeth Bolton
1940–1942 Janet Aitken
1942–1944 Clara Stewart
1944–1946 Janet Mary Campbell
1946–1948 Mary Lucas Keene
1948–1950 Gertrude Herzfeld
1950–1953 Doris Odlum
1953–1954 Mary Esslemont
1954–1955 Annis Gillie
1955–1956 Mona MacNaughton
1956–1957 Kate Harrower
1957–1958 Jean Mackintosh
1958–1959 Katharine Lloyd-Williams
1959–1960 Georgiana Bonser
1960–1961 Sylvia Guthrie
1961–1962 Joyce Cockram
1962–1963 Patricia Shaw
1963–1964 Dorothy McNair
1964–1965 Mary Crosse
1965–1966 Margaret Methven
1966–1967 Josephine Barnes
1967–1968 Marian Maxwell Reekie
1968–1969 Beryl Corner
1969–1970 Catherine Gray
1970–1971 Agnes Nutt
1971–1972 Albertine Winner
1972–1973 Jean Hallum
1973–1974 Catrin Williams
1974–1975 Josephine Williamson
1975–1976 Joan Sutherland
1976–1977 Jean Lawrie
1977–1978 Mary Jones
1978 Mary Duguid
1979–1980 Romola Dunsmore
1980–1981 Amelia Marrow
1981–1982 Ruth Bowden
1982–1983 Rosemary Rue
1983–1984 Dorothy Ward
1984–1985 Jean Scott
1986–1987 Beulah Bewley
1987–1988 Lotte Newman
1988–1989 Margaret Sprackling
1989–1990 Nuala Sterling
1990–1992 Liz Shore
1992–1993 Wendy Savage
1993–1994 Gillian Markham
1994–1995 Chitra Bharucha
1995–1996 Judith Chapman
1996–1997 Fleur Fisher
1997–1998 Anne Rennie
1998–1999 Joan Trowell
1999–2000 Fiona Subotsky
2000–2001 Kate Ward
2001–2002 Ilora Finlay
2002–2003 Pauline Brimblecombe
2003–2004 Melanie Jones
2004–2005 Selena Gray
2005–2006 Bhupinder Sandhu
2006–2007 Melanie Davies
2007–2008 Sue Ward
2008–2010 Helen Goodyear
2010–2012 Clarissa Fabre
2012–2014 Fiona Cornish
2014–2016 Sally Davies
2016–2018 Parveen Kumar
2018–2020 Henrietta Bowden-Jones
2020–2021 Neena Modi
2021–2023 Chloe Orkin
2023–2025 Scarlett McNally
2025–present Jane Dacre
