= Christine Murrell =

English doctor (1874–1933)

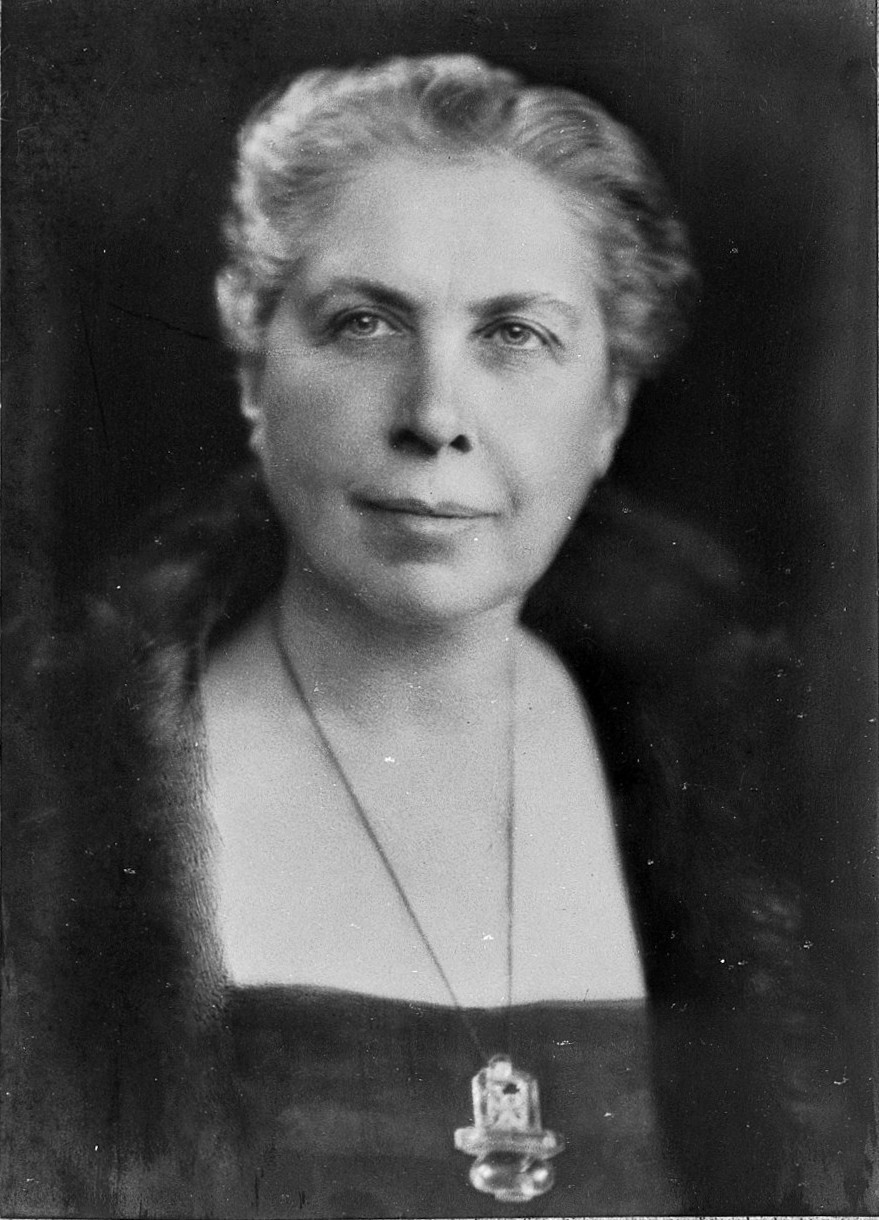
- Christine Murrell (Wellcome Collection)
- Born: Christine Mary Murrell; 18 October 1874; Clapham, London
- Died: 18 October 1933 (aged 59)
- Education: London School of Medicine for Women (MBBS); University of London (MD)
- Occupation: Medical doctor
- Known for: First woman elected to the British Medical Association's Central Council

Christine Mary Murrell (18 October 1874 – 18 October 1933) was an English medical doctor. In 1924, she became the first woman elected to the British Medical Association's Central Council. In September 1933, she was the first female representative elected to the General Medical Council. However, due to her death, she never took the seat, leaving the record to Hilda Lloyd.

== Early life and education ==
Murrell was born in 1874 in Clapham, London. Her parents were Charles Murrell, a coal merchant, and Alice Elizabeth Rains. She attended Clapham High School for Girls and the London School of Medicine for Women, receiving an MBBS in 1899. She spent the beginning of her career in various positions in Northumberland and Liverpool before returning to London to work at the Royal Free Hospital, where she was only the second woman to serve as a house physician. In 1903, she established a private practice in Bayswater with her friend Elizabeth Honor Bone. Murrell received an MD in psychology and mental diseases from the University of London in 1905. From 1907, she led an infant welfare clinic run by the St Marylebone Health Society at Lisson Grove for 18 years.

== Career ==
Murrell was also an activist for women's rights, and was involved in the women's suffrage movement before the First World War. During the war, she served in and became chair of the Women's Emergency Corps. She gave public lectures on women's health for 20 years at the London County Council, and in 1923 she published a series of lectures under the title Womanhood and Health. In 1925, she and Letitia Fairfield conducted a survey of girls' experiences of menstruation; the findings were published in The Lancet in 1930.

Murrell served on various committees of the British Medical Association, and in 1924 she became the first woman elected to its Central Council; she sat on the council for nine years, until her death. She was the fifth president of the Medical Women's Federation, from 1926 to 1928. In September 1933, she was the first female representative elected to the General Medical Council, but she died on 18 October 1933, her 59th birthday, before taking her seat.
