= Milson =

Milson may refer to:

== Places ==
- Milson, Shropshire
- Milson, New Zealand
- Milson Island, Australia
- Milsons Point, Sydney, Australia

== People ==
- Milson (name), a list of people with the name

== Other ==
- Milson, a dog in the British TV programme Friday Night Dinner
