= John Milson Rhodes =

English general practitioner (1847–1909)

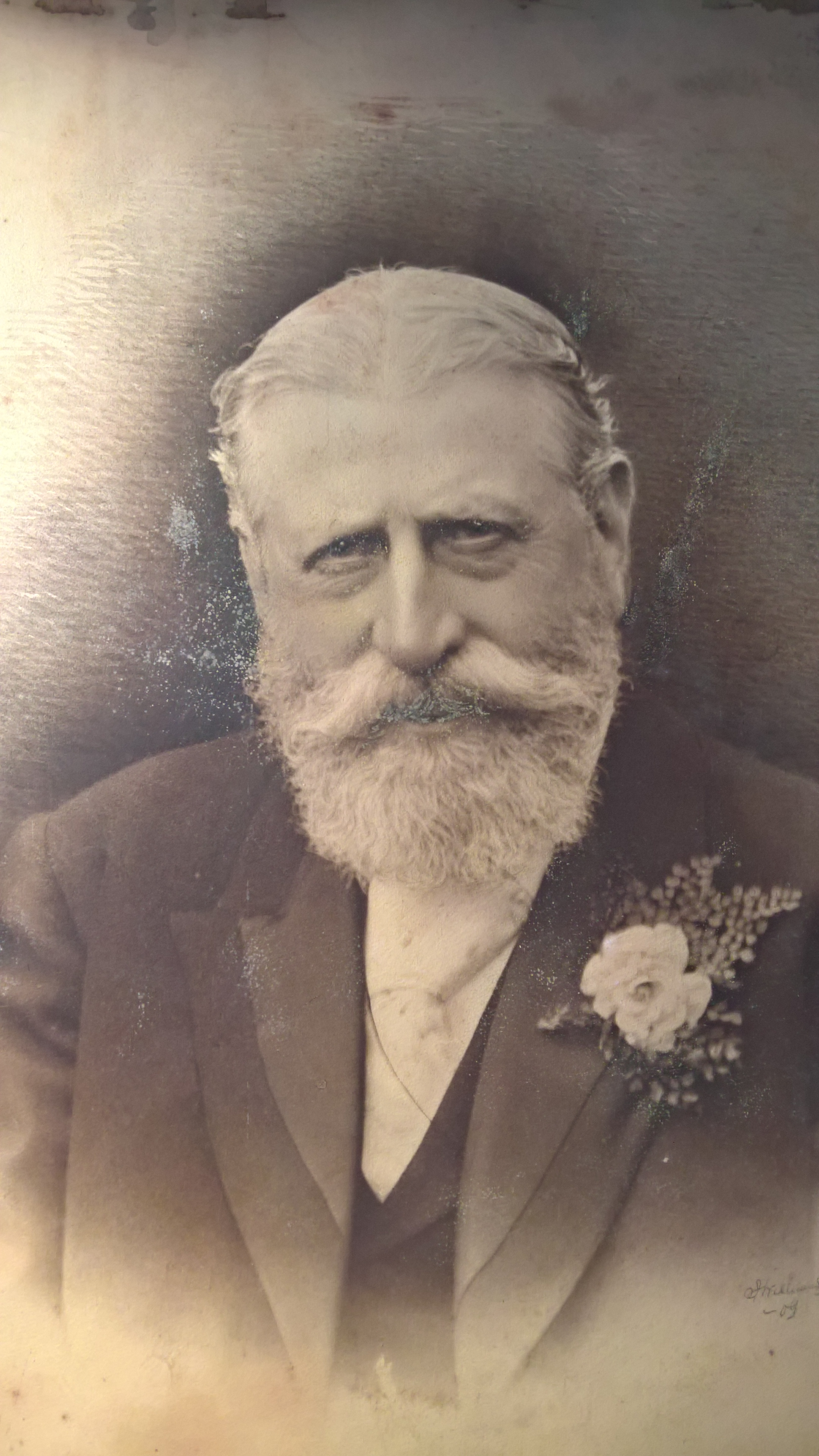

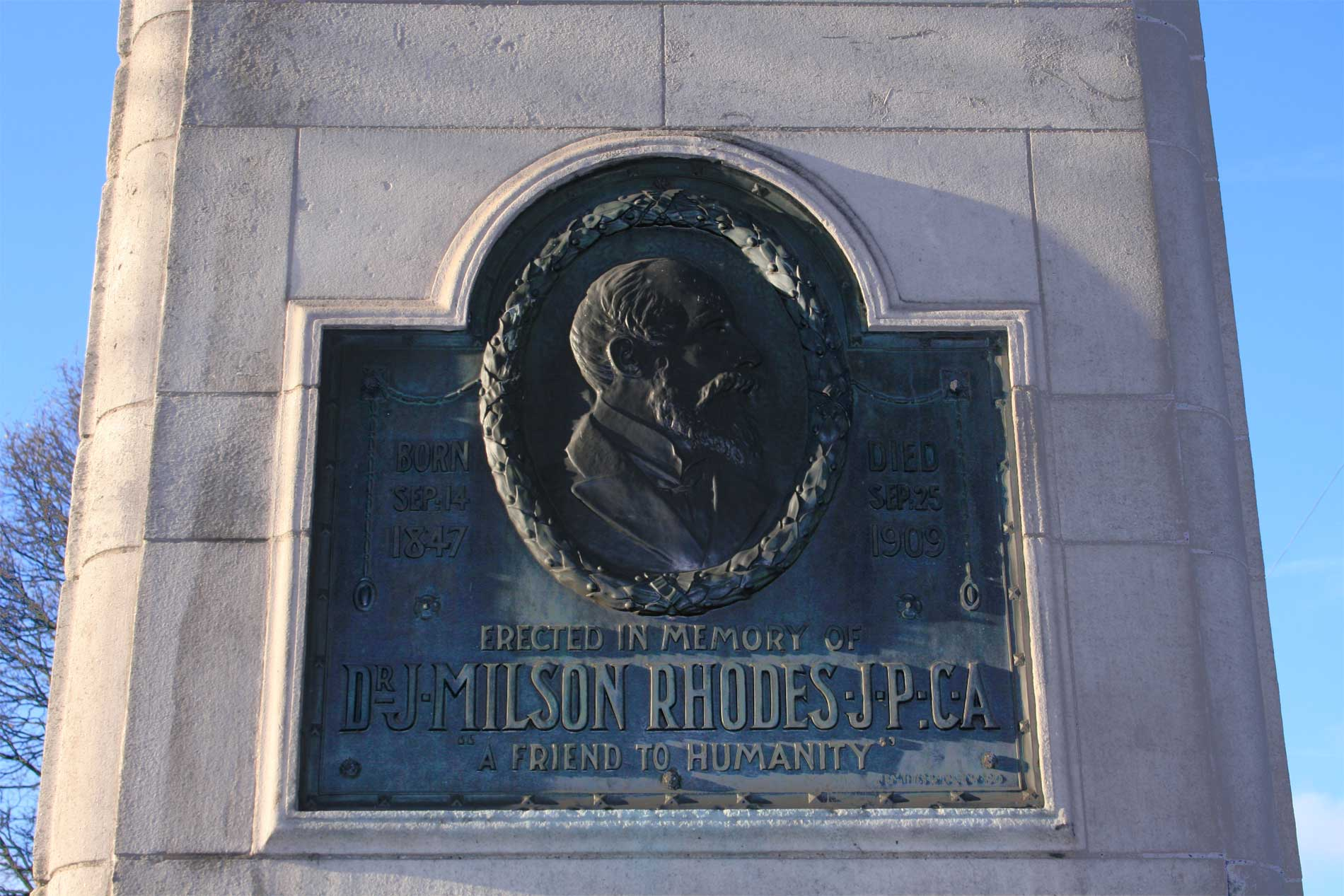
Plaque commemorating Dr.J.Milson Rhodes

John Milson Rhodes (1847 – 25 September 1909) was an English general practitioner in the suburb of Didsbury, Manchester, UK. He was noted as a pioneer of social reform.

He was born at Broughton, Salford in 1847 and studied medicine in Glasgow and at Owen's College, Manchester. He was a member of the Chorlton Board of Guardians from 1882 and involved with the workhouse which later became Withington Hospital. He helped to set up the Styal Cottage Homes. He established the Northern Workhouse Nursing Association and the Chorlton workhouse became a pioneer of trained nursing, held out by Florence Nightingale as an example.

He established the Langho Colony for Epileptics in 1904 and was involved with the David Lewis Epileptics Colony.

== Death and memorials ==
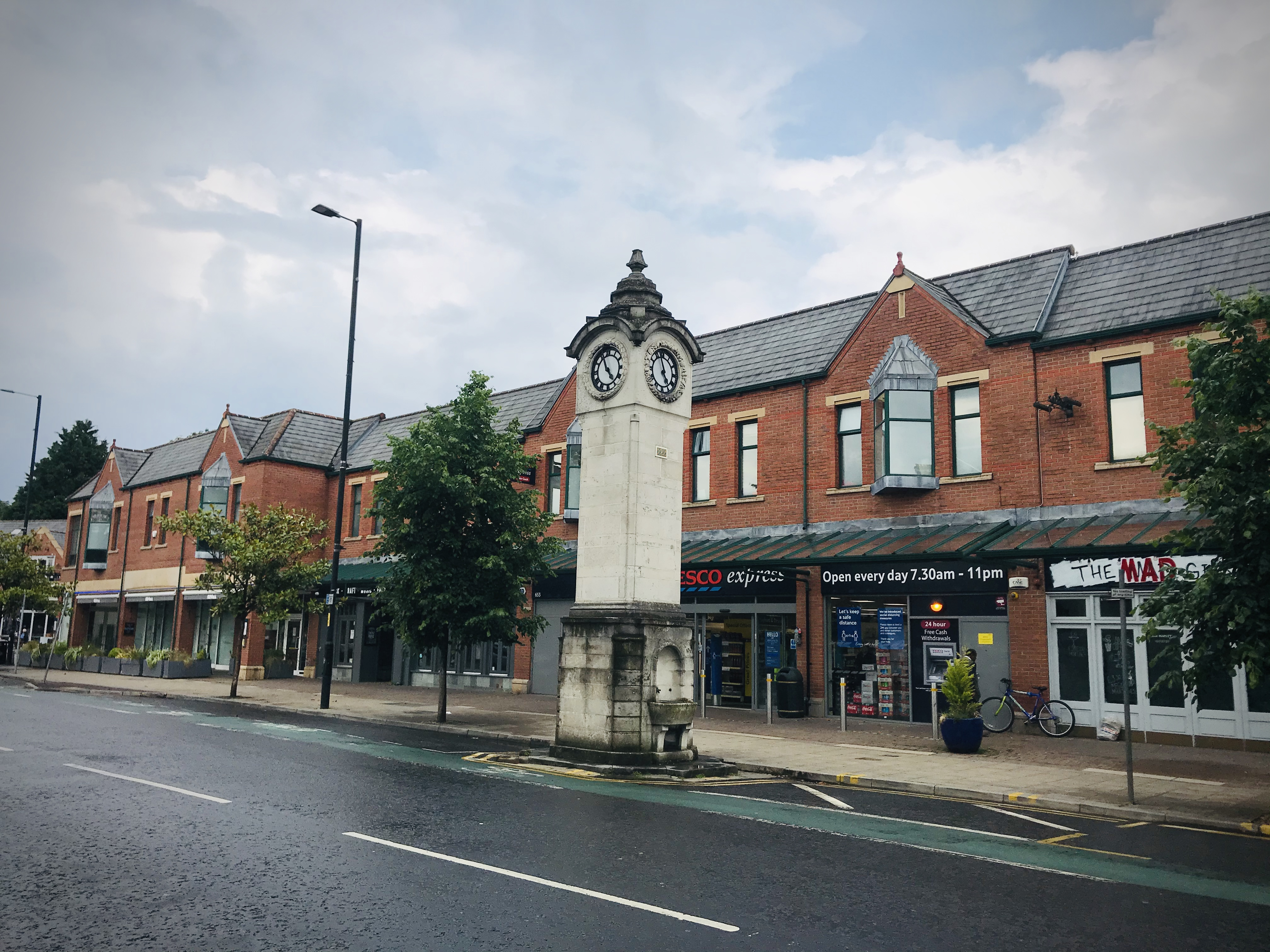
The Rhodes memorial clock in Didsbury

Rhodes died from heart failure brought on by strychnine, which he administered to himself regularly for his heart weakness. At the time, strychnine was a common treatment for bradycardia, and Rhodes administered 10 minims. His nephew, Dr. Milson Russen Rhodes, who was with him when he took the dose, testified at the inquiry into his uncle's death that he "fought for his life for an hour" before reviving him, only for him to collapse again and die. "It was a collapse which was what we both knew might take place at any moment for the last two or three years," Russen Rhodes said.

After his death, a 8-metre (26 ft) clock tower was erected in his memory in the forecourt of Didsbury railway station. The Edwardian Baroque Portland stone clock incorporates a pair of drinking fountains and bears a bronze plaque which displays a relief medallion portrait of Rhodes. The inscription reads "In memory of Dr.J.Milson Rhodes JP.CA. 1847-1909. A Friend to Humanity". Although the station was demolished in 1982, the clock still stands as a local landmark and is Grade II listed.
