= Milson Russen Rhodes =

English general practitioner (1871–1929)

Milson Russen Rhodes (1871 – 11 May 1929) was an English general practitioner in Chorlton-on-Medlock. He was born in Bradford and lived in Didsbury.

He was very active in the State Medical Service Association and the British Medical Association. He studied medicine at Owen's College and qualified in 1902.

In 1912 he proposed an outline of a new system of a National Medical Service, which was published in the British Medical Journal. He advocated a list system much like the system adopted by Lloyd George's government.

He was the nephew of John Milson Rhodes and testified at his death inquiry, having witnessed his death from an accidental strychnine overdose.
