= State Medical Service Association =

British medical association

The State Medical Service Association was a pressure group formed by British doctors early in the twentieth century to press for reform of health services.

One of its demands was for "freeing a large section of medical men and women from such distasteful and incongruous work as the assessing and collecting of fees for services rendered." It wanted to build on the National Insurance Act 1911 and develop a National Health Service, including hospital care in a comprehensive service.

Dr Benjamin Moore and Dr. Milson Russen Rhodes of Didsbury were prominent members.

The plans produced by Lord Dawson for the Lloyd George government in 1920 drew on the ideas of the Association.

It published a journal, Medical World from 1913 which was adopted by the Medical Practitioners' Union in 1914.

When the Socialist Medical Association was founded in 1930 it absorbed many of the members and the organisation collapsed as a result.
