= Clara Stewart =

British pathologist

Clara Stewart OBE
- Born: 23 November 1882; Walsall
- Died: 5 February 1973 (aged 90)
- Occupation: Pathologist
- Known for: President of the Medical Women's Federation
- Spouse: Matthew John Stewart (m. 1913-1956; his death)
- Medical career
- Profession: Physician, pathologist

Clara Stewart, OBE (23 November 1882 - 5 February 1973), was a British pathologist and president of the Medical Women's Federation.

She was born in Walsall and educated at the Girls' High School, Lichfield. She studied medicine at the University of Birmingham and took the London M.B., B.S. in 1908. Her husband was fellow pathologist Matthew John Stewart, whom she married in 1913. He died in 1956. She moved to live in Ongar, Essex.

== Selected publications ==
- Stewart, Clara (April 1933). "Tuberculous Infection of Uterine Endometrioma". BJOG: An International Journal of Obstetrics & Gynaecology. 40 (2): 299–301. doi:10.1111/j.1471-0528.1933.tb05302.x. ISSN 1470-0328.
