= Acheson Report =

1998 British health equity report

The Acheson Report, fully titled the Independent Inquiry into Inequalities in Health Report, was a report published in 1998 by a United Kingdom inquiry headed by Donald Acheson. Another report, "Public health in England: The Report of the Committee of Inquiry into the Future Development to the Public Health Function", which played a crucial role in the organisation of the public health function in England, is sometimes also referred to as the Acheson Report.

== Background ==
Like earlier reports on health disparities in the United Kingdom including the Black Report and the Whitehall Study, the Acheson report demonstrates the existence of health disparities and their relationship to social class. Among the report's findings are that despite an overall downward trend in mortality from 1970 to 1990, the upper social classes experienced a more rapid mortality decline. The report contains 39 policy suggestions in areas ranging from taxation to agriculture, for ameliorating health disparities. It had some influence on the 1998 government green paper Our Healthier Nation: A Contract for Health which had a stated aim of reducing health inequalities; and the 1999 white paper Saving Lives: Our Healthier Nation.

== Inquiry members ==
The following were members of the inquiry:

- Donald Acheson (chair)
- David Barker
- Jacky Chambers
- Hilary Graham
- Michael Marmot
- Margaret Whitehead

== Impact ==
In 2016, Professor Clare Bambra compared the report with the earlier Black Report and the later report by Michael Marmot. The Acheson report was released into a more favourable climate than either. She said that at least between 1997 and 2003, health policy across the UK reflected some of the ideas set out in the Black and Acheson Reports. There was a consistent emphasis on the need to tackle the social and economic determinants of health inequalities as well as a commitment to employing cross-cutting government policies to tackle health inequality. Most importantly, by 2004, national targets to reduce health inequalities were also introduced with a focus on life expectancy and Infant Mortality Rate. A series of initiatives were introduced - Health Action Zones, Healthy Living Centres, Health Improvement Programmes and the New Deal for Communities. But, perhaps because of these initiatives, from 2004 to 2007, public health policy moved away from social and economic determinants and instead focused more on health services and lifestyle behaviours. The health inequalities targets were abandoned across the UK in 2011. The effect of policy in reducing health inequality was modest.

== See also ==
- Black Report
