= Guillebaud =

Guillebaud is a surname. Notable people with the surname include:

- Claude Guillebaud (1890–1971), British economist and public servant
- Jean-Claude Guillebaud (1944–2025), French writer, essayist, lecturer and journalist
- John Guillebaud, British medical doctor
- Walter Guillebaud (1890–1973), British civil servant and forester, twin brother of Claude

== See also ==
- Guillebaud Report, see Enquiry into the Cost of the National Health Service
- Chris Guillebeau (born 1978), American author, entrepreneur, blogger, and speaker
