= Michael Shanks (disambiguation) =

Michael Shanks (born 1970) is a Canadian actor.

Michael Shanks may also refer to:

- Michael Shanks (archaeologist) (born 1959), British archaeologist
- Michael Shanks (filmmaker) (born 1990 or 1991), Australian filmmaker
- Michael Shanks (journalist) (1927–1984), British journalist
- Michael Shanks (politician) (born 1988), British politician
- Uncle Mover (born Michael Shanks, 1953), American perennial political candidate

== See also ==
- Michael Shank (born 1966), American race car team owner and former race car driver
