= Black Report =

1980 British health equity report

The Black Report was a 1980 document published by the Department of Health and Social Security (now the Department of Health and Social Care) in the United Kingdom, which was the report of the expert committee into health inequality chaired by Sir Douglas Black. It was demonstrated that although, in general, health had improved since the introduction of the welfare state, there were widespread health inequalities. It also found that the main cause of these inequalities was economic inequality. The report showed that the death rate for men in social class V was twice that for men in social class I and that gap between the two was increasing, not reducing as was expected.

== Commissioning ==
The Black report was commissioned in March 1977 by David Ennals, Labour Secretary of State, following publication of a two-page article by Richard G. Wilkinson in New Society, on 16 December 1976, entitled "Dear David Ennals". The report was nearly ready for publication in early 1979.

In the General Election on 3 May 1979, the Conservatives were elected. The Black Report was not issued until 1980 by the Conservative Government. The Black report was published on August Bank Holiday with only 260 copies made available on the day for the media. The foreword, by Patrick Jenkin, rejected "the view that the causes of health inequalities are so deep rooted that only a major and wide-ranging programme of public expenditure is capable of altering the pattern." He made "it clear that additional expenditure on the scale which could result from the report’s recommendations – the amount involved could be upwards of £2 billion a year – is quite unrealistic in present or any foreseeable economic circumstances, quite apart from any judgement that may be formed of the effectiveness of such expenditure in dealing with the problems identified."

The report had a huge impact on political thought in the United Kingdom and overseas. It led to an assessment by the Office for Economic Co-Operation and Development and the World Health Organization of health inequalities in 13 countries.

== Impact ==
Professor Clare Bambra in 2019 compared the report with the later Acheson Report and the subsequent report by Michael Marmot. The Acheson report was released into a more favourable climate than either. She said that at least between 1997 and 2003, health policy across the UK reflected some of the ideas set out in the Black and Acheson Reports. There was a consistent emphasis on the need to tackle the social and economic determinants of health inequalities as well as a commitment to employing cross-cutting government policies to tackle health inequality. Most importantly, by 2004, national targets to reduce health inequalities were also introduced with a focus on life expectancy and Infant Mortality Rate. A series of initiatives were introduced - Health Action Zones, Healthy Living Centres, Health Improvement Programmes and the New Deal for Communities. But, perhaps because of these initiatives, from 2004 to 2007, public health policy moved away from social and economic determinants and instead focused more on health services and lifestyle behaviours. The health inequalities targets were abandoned across the UK in 2011. The effect of policy in reducing health inequality was modest.

== Related publications ==
Penguin Books published a shortened version of the Black Report in 1982, making it widely available

The Whitehall Report published in 1987 came to the same conclusions as the Black report, as did the Acheson Report later in 1998, and the Marmot Review in 2010.
