= Social Medicine Research Unit =

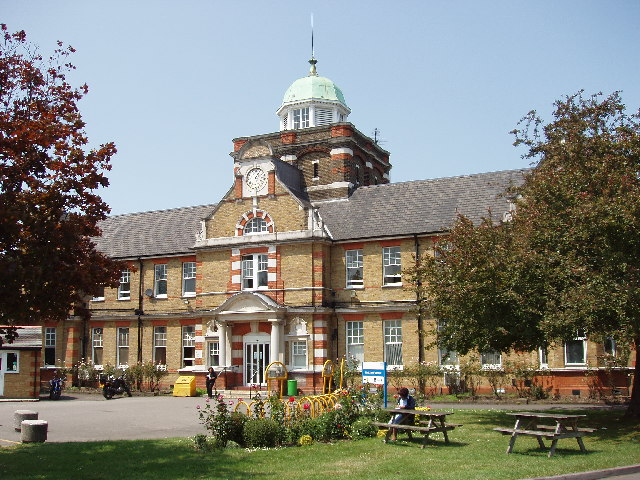
- Central Middlesex Hospital, the unit's first home
- Established: 1948 (closed 1975)
- Director: Jerry Morris
- Location: London, United Kingdom

The Social Medicine Research Unit (SMRU) was a Medical Research Council (MRC) research unit, established in 1948 under the direction of epidemiologist Jerry Morris. Based initially at the Central Middlesex Hospital in London, the SMRU became one of the most influential centres of postwar British social medicine. Its research helped establish the role of physical activity, diet, and environmental factors in chronic disease, contributed to the emergence of lifestyle epidemiology, and informed the development of community‑oriented public health policy in the United Kingdom.

== History and initiation ==
The Social Medicine Research Unit was created by the United Kingdom MRC on 1 January 1948 following a proposal in June 1946 by the occupational public health specialist, Richard Schilling who was scientific secretary of the MRC's Industrial Health Research Board. The new unit was intended to address three overlapping topics:

- the medical study of life in groups and communities;
- the environmental factors affecting health and the incidence of disease and the control of these factors;
- the social relations of individual health and sickness.

Sir Edward Mellanby, the Secretary of the MRC, was sympathetic to the idea that social and environmental factors might be important causes of disease, and was keen to establish units with a social dimension. He had read a paper in the Lancet by Morris and Richard Titmuss about unemployment and mortalitiy from peptic ulcer, which led to him interviewing Morris in October 1946 to discuss setting up a unit. Morris was considered 'a suitable person for [the] post' despite him being 'just 36 years of age'. Morris was appointed as director and Titmuss as deputy director, and it became the 39th MRC unit. Mellanby subsequently commented that: "He [Morris] seems a decent modest fellow, and certainly made no great claims."

== Formation ==
Following a meeting with Mellanby in January 1947, Morris and Titmuss submitted a formal proposal for a Social Medicine Research Unit to the MRC. Horace Joules, physician and medical director of the Central Middlesex Hospital, suggested that the unit be based there. Morris wrote to the MRC that the unit "will have to be in London, should be in a working class industrial area and would gain much from association with a large general hospital".

On 18 April 1947, the MRC Council agreed to fund the unit for an initial period of five years. Funding began on 1 January 1948, although accommodation was not available until later that year, when a brick‑built hut costing £3,345 was completed. The founding staff included Morris, Titmuss, Maurice Backett, Bob Logan, and statistician John Astley Heady.

== Early research priorities ==
=== Coronary heart disease ===
One of the unit's first priorities was to investigate social factors in the aetiology of coronary heart disease (CHD). Morris later recalled that the "epidemic" of CHD was the most pressing problem facing postwar medicine. His focus on this topic was probably influenced by earlier links with the Framingham Heart Study.

The MRC approved the CHD proposal on the grounds that it was "a relatively small and circumscribed problem which might give a clear positive or negative answer within a year or two". Morris replied that 'I am afraid we have yet to come across any social problems that are 'simple', but we are hopeful that through the teamwork of various disciplines we may be able to learn something.'. So during 1948 the unit began preparing surveys of CHD incidence across occupational and social groups, securing cooperation from the Treasury, the Medical Sickness Society, the Army, several steel firms, and London Transport.

=== Reproduction and infant mortality ===
In June 1948 Morris proposed a collaboration with the Department of Midwifery at the University of Aberdeen to study the relationships between social factors, stillbirth and maternal health. Alongside this he initiated a study of infant mortality to cover all births in 1949 using birth certificate information provided by the General Register Office; this is considered the first major medical record linkage study. Its findings, published as a series of articles in the Lancet, highlighted associations between maternal age, parity and social class on infant mortality.

=== General practice and community studies ===
A 1948–50 progress report described a general practice study in which all patient contacts with three general practitioners were recorded over one year. A parallel programme of home visits to 100 families represented an early example of community needs assessment.

== 1952 MRC review and the move to Royal London Hospital ==
By March 1952 the unit employed fourteen scientific staff, including three medical researchers, five psychological researchers (including the psychiatrist Pierre M. Turquet), three sociologists, and three statisticians. Titmuss had by then left to take up the chair of Social Administration at the London School of Economics. In 1952 the MRC reviewed the unit, expressing concerns about its psychological orientation and the scientific validity of personality‑based methods. The MRC allowed the unit to continue for up to five years, provided that its programme was more tightly focused and that it be attached to a medical school. Consequently, in 1957 the SMRU relocated to the Royal London Hospital.

== Subsequent research topics ==
=== Coronary heart disease and physical activity ===
Perhaps, the unit's most influential achievement was demonstrating that physical activity was associated with reduced risk of CHD. Morris's occupational studies—most famously comparing bus conductors with bus drivers—helped establish exercise as a preventive health intervention. In a BBC radio broadcast and accompanying Listener article in 1954, Morris coined the phrase "the chairborne generation" in relation to the post-war epidemic of coronary artery disease.

=== Psychosomatic and behavioural studies ===
The unit conducted psychosocial research, including a study of psychological predisposing factors for duodenal ulcer in young men. As part of the evaluation Harold Himsworth criticised the overemphasis on psychological assessments and questioned the validity of personality‑based methods.

=== Diet, cholesterol, and cardiovascular risk ===
The SMRU undertook several studies on diet and cardiovascular disease, including:

- Diet and Plasma Cholesterol in 99 Bank Men
- A study of water hardness and cardiovascular mortality

The latter contributed to the establishment of the British Regional Heart Study. The unit also participated in the World Health Organization Cooperative Trial on Primary Prevention of Ischaemic Heart Disease with Clofibrate, published in The Lancet.

The unit continued its work into the 1970s, mainly focusing on cardiovascular disease. The unit closed in 1975, which coincided with Morris' official retirement, although he continued to work and make a major contribution to epidemiology and public health after the unit's closure.

== Influence on epidemiology and public health ==
The SMRU played an important role in the development of postwar British social medicine at a time when the National Health Service was being established and the discipline of social medicine was expanding rapidly. Initially social medicine emphasized the social and economic determinants of health and was frequently linked to political aims, but later it became more focused on individual behaviours.

Morris's 1957 textbook, 'Uses of Epidemiology' had a major influence on the development of epidemiology, and Morris himself. had a significant influence on the health policy of the 1964–1970 Labour government, working with Titmuss and Brian Abel-Smith to develop community diagnosis and the role of Community Physicians. Dorothy Porter, and Virginia Berridge have discussed the SMRU in relation to the rise of surveillance medicine and the institutionalisation of social medicine in postwar Britain.

In addition, the SMRU also played a major role in training epidemiologists. Alumni included: A. G. (Gerry) Shaper, Hugh Tunstall‑Pedoe, Margaret Crawford, and Tilda Goldberg.
