= Roy Robinson, 1st Baron Robinson =

British forester and public servant

The Right Honourable The Lord Robinson OBE
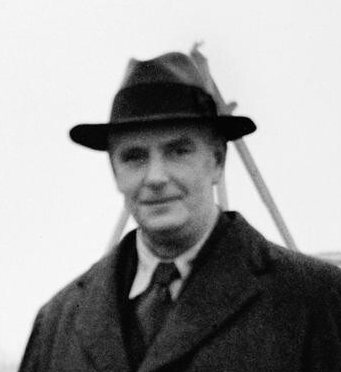
- Robinson c. 1942
- Born: Roy Lister Robinson; 8 March 1883; Macclesfield, South Australia
- Died: 5 September 1952 (aged 69); Ottawa, Canada
- Cricket career

Cricket information
- Batting: Right-handed
- Bowling: Right-arm fast

Domestic team information
- Years: Team
- 1908–1909: Oxford University
- 1910: Gentlemen of England
- FC debut: 14 May 1908 Oxford Univ. v Lancashire
- Last FC: 6 June 1910 Gents of England v Oxford Univ.

Career statistics
Competition	First-class
Matches	13
Runs scored	256
Batting average	12.19
100s/50s	0/1
Top score	51
Balls bowled	1,698
Wickets	44
Bowling average	22.68
5 wickets in innings	4
10 wickets in match	0
Best bowling	6/90
Catches/stumpings	6/–
- Source: CricketArchive, 17 June 2015

Roy Lister Robinson, Baron Robinson, OBE (8 March 1883 – 5 September 1952), known as Sir Roy Robinson between 1931 and 1947, was a British forester and public servant.

== Background and education ==
Robinson was born in Macclesfield, South Australia, the son of William Robinson. He won an exhibition to the Collegiate School of St Peter, Adelaide, in 1896. Whilst at school he played cricket for the school team.

He entered the School of Mines and Industries in 1900 to study mining engineering, and combined study for its fellowship diploma (passing eleven subjects with distinction in one year) with his course at the University of Adelaide (BSc, 1905).

He was awarded a Rhodes scholarship in 1905 (the second from South Australia) to Magdalen College, Oxford, where he graduated with a B.A. in 1908. He obtained first-class honours (1907) in natural science (geology) and the diploma (1908), with distinction, in forestry (under Sir William Schlich), also representing the university in cricket, athletics and lacrosse. He played in 12 first-class cricket matches for the University side during 1908 and 1909, winning a Blue in both years as well as playing against the touring Australians in 1909. In 1910 he played for the Gentlemen of England amateur side against the university, his final first-class match. Primarily a bowler, he took 44 first-class wickets.

== Career ==
In 1909 Robinson was appointed assistant inspector for forestry at the Board of Agriculture and Fisheries, London, and laid the foundations of what was to become an unrivalled knowledge of the forests and forestry of Britain. He was largely responsible for the report which led to the establishment of the Forestry Commission in 1919 and his appointment as its technical commissioner. He became vice-chairman of the commission in 1929, and chairman in 1932, holding that office until he died.

He was appointed an Officer of the Order of the British Empire (OBE) in 1918, knighted in 1931 and raised to the peerage as Baron Robinson, of Kielder Forest in the County of Northumberland and of Adelaide in the Commonwealth of Australia, in 1947.

Robinson was one of the founders of the Society of Foresters of Great Britain and first president and first recipient of its medal (1947) for eminent services to British forestry. He was an honorary member (1940) of the Society of American Foresters and the Institute of Foresters of Australia; corresponding member (1947) of the Académie d'Agriculture de France; and an honorary LL.D. of the University of Aberdeen.

== Family ==
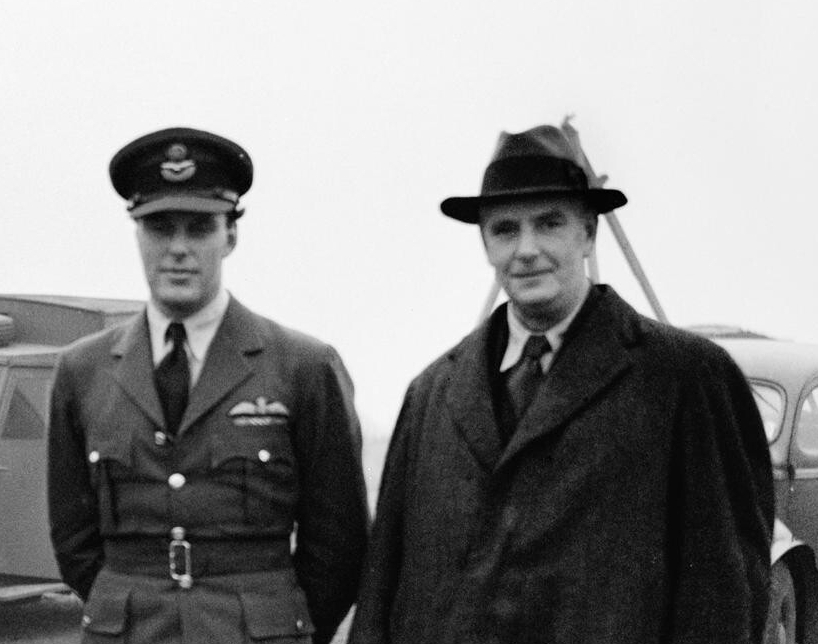
Robinson (right) with his son Michael during WW2

Lord Robinson married Charlotte Marion, daughter of Henry Cust Bradshaw, on 26 November 1910 at St James' Church, Marylebone, London. They had one son, Michael Robinson, who was killed on active service in 1942, and two daughters.

== Death ==
Lord Robinson died of pneumonia while attending the British Commonwealth Forestry Conference in Ottawa on 5 September 1952, aged 69. As his only son had predeceased him, the barony died with him.

Government offices
New title	Director-General of the Forestry Commission; 1945–1947	Succeeded by Sir William Taylor
Peerage of the United Kingdom
New creation	Baron Robinson; 1947–1952	Extinct
