= Pierre Turquet =

British psychiatrist and fencer

Dr. Pierre Turquet
Personal information
- Full name: Pierre Maurice Turquet
- Nationality: British and French
- Born: 13 December 1913 Wandsworth, London, England
- Died: 27 December 1975 (aged 62) France

Sport
- Sport: Olympic Fencing

Achievements and titles
- Olympic finals: 1948 Olympics

Pierre Maurice Turquet (13 December 1913 – 27 December 1975) was an English psychiatrist and psychoanalyst at the Tavistock Clinic with a special interest in group relations. He was also a British Olympic fencer, who competed in the team foil event at the 1948 Summer Olympics.

== Life ==
Pierre Turquet was the son of André Turquet (1869–1940), French-born director of the London Diplomatic Service crammer 'Scoones', and Gladys Turquet (c.1889-1977), head of French at Westfield College, London and professor of French at Bedford College. He was educated at Westminster School and Trinity College, Cambridge, where he switched from history to science before completing medical training at the London Hospital.

During World War II he was a Major in the Royal Army Medical Corps, helping to develop the War Office Selection Boards. He married Clare Hunter in 1940. He was subsequently seconded to SHAEF and the French War Office. After the war he was Research Psychiatrist at the MRC Social Medicine Research Unit, researching the interpersonal and intrafamily relations of young people with duodenal ulcers,

In 1951, he won the sabre title at the British Fencing Championships. The following year in 19512 he became a consultant psychiatrist at the Tavistock Clinic. He worked as a group analyst. From 1968 to 1973 he was Chairman of the Adult Department of the Tavistock.

He died on 27 December 1975 as a result of a road accident in France.
