= George Ryle =

George Bodley Ryle, CBE (4 March 1902 – 14 February 1978) was a British civil servant and forester.

Born on 4 March 1902, Ryle was the son of Reginald John Ryle, a doctor. He attended St Catherine's College, Oxford, completing a diploma in forestry in 1923. He joined the Forestry Commission's staff in 1924 as a district officer in eastern England, moving to south Wales in 1928. In 1936, the government prioritised afforestation in the valleys of south Wales to help relieve unemployment amongst the coal miners; Ryle was appointed the divisional officer and oversaw the introduction of thriving woodland to those areas.

For the duration of the Second World War, Ryle was seconded to the Home Timber Production Department of the Ministry of Supply. Between 1945 and 1947, he served on the North German Timber Control. Returning to the Forestry Commission, he was appointed a Conservator for England in 1947; during this tenure, he was responsible for the acquisition of 160,000 acres of land. He was successively Director of Forestry for Wales from 1954 to 1958, Director of Forestry for England from 1958 to 1963 and then Deputy Director-General of the commission from 1963 until his retirement in 1965; he was the last holder of the latter office. For his services, he was appointed a Commander of the Order of the British Empire in 1960. He died on 14 February 1978.

Government offices
Preceded by James Macdonald	Deputy Director-General of the Forestry Commission; 1963–1965	office abolished
