= Walter Guillebaud =

British civil servant and forester

Walter Henry Guillebaud CBE (2 July 1890 – 1 November 1973) was a British civil servant and forester.

He was born on 2 July 1890, the son of The Rev. Ernest Guillebaud (1856–1907), Rector of Yatesbury, and Mabel Louise Marshall (1850–1912), who was a sister of the economist Alfred Marshall. His elder brother Harold became a missionary; his twin brother Claude William became an influential economist at the University of Cambridge; and his younger brother Cyril died in 1915. Walter studied at Repton School, Victoria College, Manchester, and at St John's College, Cambridge, where he read natural sciences.

He was appointed an assistant inspector in the forestry branch of the Board of Agriculture in 1914. When the Forestry Commission was established in 1919, he became its research officer and six years later its divisional officer. He was appointed its Chief Research Officer in 1928 and its Director of Research and Education in 1945, as which he served until 1948. He was Deputy Director-General of the Forestry Commission between 1948 and 1953.

By the late 1940s, Guillebaud had been "the leading figure in forest research since the early twenties". He served as president of the Institute of Foresters of Great Britain from 1945 to 1947 and published ten articles in its journal, Forestry. The forester J. A. B. Macdonald recalled him as "cadaverous in appearance [but] nevertheless gentle, retiring and timid by nature... [h]e was definitely a scholar by preference, and I doubt if there was very much that was really original either about his work or his thoughts". Nevertheless, the Commission contended that "his valuable work ... plac[ed] [the Commission's] research efforts on a firm footing". He was appointed a Commander of the Order of the British Empire (CBE) in the 1951 New Year Honours. He died on 1 November 1973.

Government offices
New title	Director of Research and Education, Forestry Commission; 1945–1948	Succeeded by James Macdonald
Preceded by Arthur Gosling	Deputy Director-General of the Forestry Commission; 1948–1953	Succeeded by Sir Henry Beresford-Peirse
