= Sir Henry Beresford-Peirse, 5th Baronet =

Beresford-Peirse in 1965.

Sir Henry Campbell de la Poer Beresford-Peirse, 5th Baronet, CB, FRSE (24 April 1905 – 11 August 1972) was a British civil servant.

Born on 24 April 1905, he was the son of Sir Henry Bernard de la Poer Beresford-Peirse, 4th Baronet (1875–1949), and his wife Lady Mabel Marjorie Campbell (1876–1966) daughter of Frederick Campbell, 3rd Earl Cawdor. After attending Eton College, he studied at Magdalen College, Oxford, graduating in 1927 with a BA and in 1929 with a BSc in forestry. He inherited the baronetcy including the family seat Bedale Hall from his father in 1949.

Beresford-Peirse entered the Forestry Commission in 1931 as a district officer. After serving in the Second World War, he was appointed Director of Forestry for Scotland in 1947 (succeeding Arthur Gosling); he served in that office until 1953, when he succeeded W. H. Guillebaud as Deputy Director-General of the Forestry Commission (he was succeeded by A. H. H. Ross in Scotland). From 1960 to 1962, he was seconded as Deputy Director of the Forestry Division of the UN Food and Agriculture Organization (with James Macdonald acting for him at the Forestry Commission in his absence). In 1962, he was appointed Director-General of the Forestry Commission, succeeding Sir Arthur Gosling. Macdonald took over his position as Deputy Director-General. In 1965, Beresford-Peirse was also appointed Deputy Chairman of the Commission, holding both offices until he retired in 1968. He died on 11 August 1972 and his baronetcy was inherited by his son, Henry. He had been appointed a Companion of the Order of the Bath (CB) in the 1957 New Year Honours and received the Gold Medal of the Royal Forestry Society in 1963. He was elected a Fellow of the Royal Society of Edinburgh (FRSE) in 1952.

Government offices
Preceded by Arthur Gosling	Director of Forestry for Scotland, Forestry Commission; 1947–1953	Succeeded by A. H. H. Ross
Preceded by W. H. Guillebaud	Deputy Director-General of the Forestry Commission; 1953–1962	Succeeded by James Macdonald
Preceded by Sir Arthur Gosling	Director-General of the Forestry Commission; 1962–1968	Succeeded by John Dickson
Preceded by The Earl Waldegrave	Deputy Chairman of the Forestry Commission; 1965–1968	Succeeded by John Dickson
Baronetage of the United Kingdom
Preceded by Henry Beresford-Peirse	Baronet of Bagnall; 1949–1972	Succeeded by Henry Beresford-Peirse
