= William Taylor (civil servant) =

Sir William Ling Taylor, CBE (29 May 1882 – 5 January 1969) was a British civil servant and forester.

Born on 29 May 1882, Taylor was educated at the Royal Institution of Chartered Surveyors, receiving a diploma in forestry. He worked as a land agent from 1901 to 1909, then began working for the state.

Taylor entered the Forestry Commission in 1919 and served as the assistant commissioner for England and Wales from 1932 to 1938, when he was appointed a forestry commissioner. He was the inaugural Deputy Director-General of the Forestry Commission, serving from 1945 to 1947 (being succeeded by Arthur Gosling), and was then Director-General from 1947 to 1948, in succession to Sir Roy Robinson; on his retirement, he was succeeded as Director-General by Gosling. He remained on the commission in 1949. He had also been in the Home Timber Production Department of the wartime Ministry of Supply from 1939 to 1941.

Taylor, who had been president of the Society of Foresters of Great Britain from 1936 to 1938, was appointed a Commander of the Order of the British Empire (CBE) in the 1945 New Year Honours, and was knighted in the 1949 New Year Honours. He died on 5 January 1969.

Government offices
New title	Deputy Director-General of the Forestry Commission; 1945–1947	Succeeded by Arthur Gosling
Preceded by Sir Roy Robinson	Director-General of the Forestry Commission; 1947–1948	Succeeded by Sir Arthur Gosling
