= Arthur Gosling =

British civil servant and forester

Arthur Hulin Gosling (26 July 1901 – 8 August 1982) was a British civil servant and forester.

Born on 26 July 1901, Gosling attended Bell's Grammar School in Coleford and, after serving briefly in the Air Ministry, enrolled at the Forestry Commissioners' School for Forestry; he became an instructor there in 1920. Two years later, he became forester-in-charge at Llanover Forest. He then studied at the University of Edinburgh from 1925 to 1928, earning a degree in forestry.

Gosling returned to the Forestry Commission in 1928 as a district officer and was promoted to divisional officer ten years later. In 1940, he was appointed Assistant Commissioner for Scotland. In 1946, he became Director of Forestry for Scotland, before he was appointed Deputy Director-General of the Forestry Commission in 1947 and then Director-General in 1948, serving until he retired in 1962. He then chaired the Commonwealth Forestry Association until 1972. He died on 8 August 1982 in Dorest. He was appointed a Companion of the Order of the Bath (CB) in the 1950 New Year Honours and a Knight Commander of the Order of the British Empire (KBE) in 1955 Birthday Honours. He was also elected a Fellow of the Royal Society of Edinburgh in 1942.

Government offices
New title	Director of Forestry for Scotland, Forestry Commission; 1946–1947	Succeeded by Sir Henry Beresford-Peirse
Preceded by Sir William Taylor	Deputy Director-General of the Forestry Commission; 1947–1948	Succeeded by W. H. Guillebaud
Preceded by Sir William Taylor	Director-General of the Forestry Commission; 1948–1962	Succeeded by Sir Henry Beresford-Peirse
