= Brian Abel-Smith =

British economist

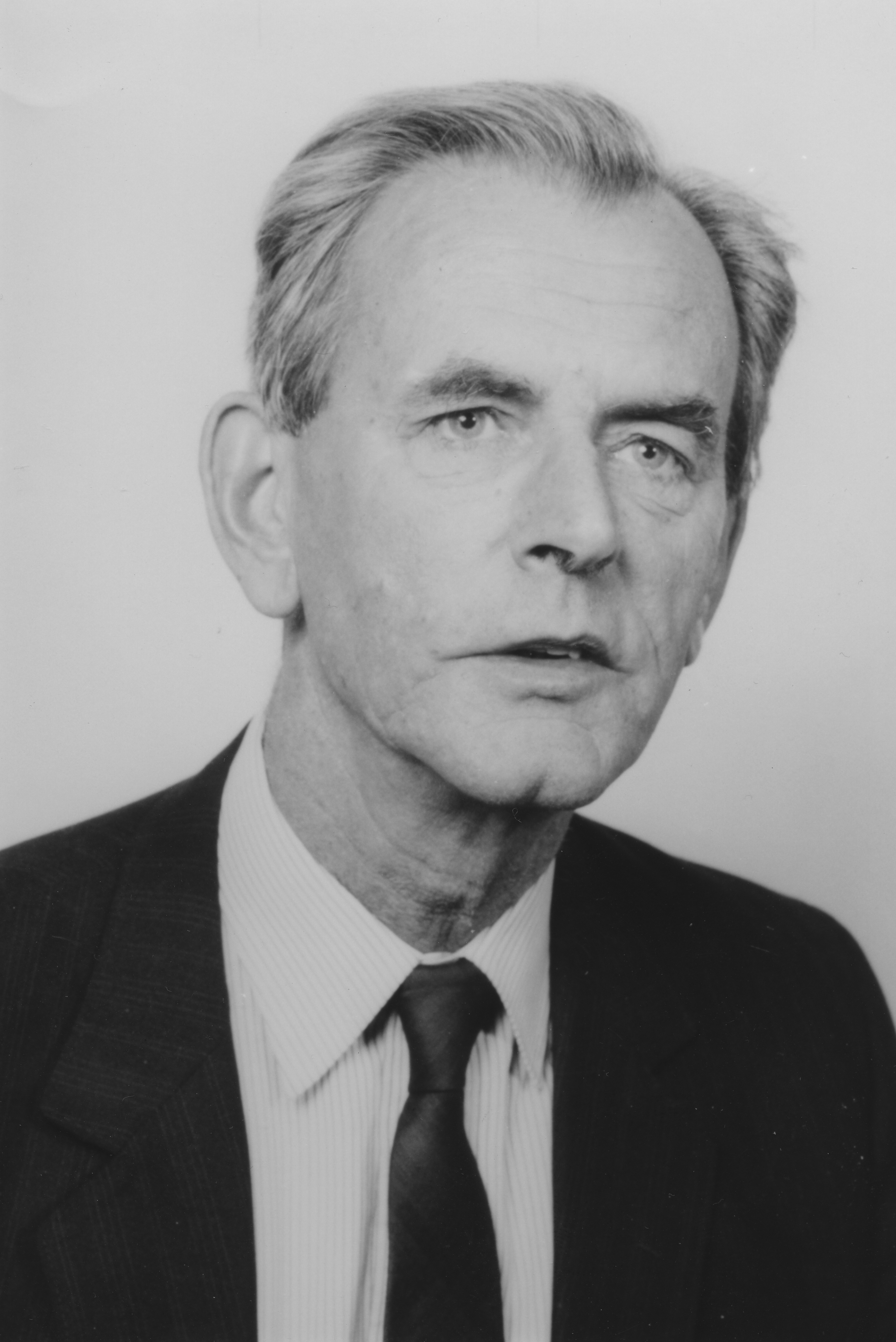
- Brian Abel-Smith
- Born: 6 November 1926; London, England
- Died: 4 April 1996 (aged 69); London, England
- Education: Hordle House Prep School; Haileybury College; Clare College, Cambridge
- Occupation: Economist
- Parents: Lionel Abel-Smith (father); Genevieve Lilac Walsh (mother)
- Relatives: Abel Smith (great-grandfather)
- Military career
- Allegiance: United Kingdom
- Branch: British Army
- Service years: 1946–1948
- Unit: Oxfordshire and Buckinghamshire Light Infantry

Brian Abel-Smith (6 November 1926 – 4 April 1996) was a British economist and expert adviser and one of the most influential figures of the twentieth century in shaping health and social welfare. In Britain, his research for the Guillebaud committee in 1956 proved that the NHS provided extremely good value for money and deserved more investment. From the 1960s he was one of a new breed of special advisers to Labour government ministers – helping Richard Crossman, Barbara Castle and David Ennals to reconfigure the NHS, set up Resource Allocation Working Party, and the Black Inquiry into Health Inequalities. Internationally, he steered the development of health services in over 50 countries. He was a key WHO and EEC adviser, involved in setting the agenda for global campaigns such as Health for All by the year 2000.

== Biography ==
Abel-Smith was born at 24 Kensington Court Gardens, London, the younger son of Brigadier-General Lionel Abel-Smith (1870–1946), and his wife, Genevieve Lilac (1898–1980), daughter of Robert Walsh, of Armagh. His elder brother, Lionel Abel-Smith (1924–2011), inherited the title and estate of Lord of the Manor of Wendover, Buckinghamshire. Abel-Smith was great-grandson of the politician Abel Smith, of the Smith family of bankers established by Thomas Smith in the 1600s.

Abel-Smith was educated at Hordle House Preparatory School (1935–39) and Haileybury College (1940–1945), before entering the army for his National Service. He was commissioned in the Oxfordshire and Buckinghamshire Light Infantry in 1946 and was ADC (aide-de-camp) to Sir John Winterton, the military governor of the British zone in Austria during 1947–8. He entered Clare College, Cambridge, in 1948, graduating with an upper second in Economics in 1951. He was an active member of the Cambridge Union and the University Labour Club.

Abel-Smith remained at Cambridge to study for a PhD under the supervision of the economist Joan Robinson. From 1953 he aligned his research to fit with his appointment as research assistant at the National Institute of Economic and Social Research (under the supervision of Professor Richard Titmuss of the Department of Social Administration at the London School of Economics) to assist with the Guillebaud Enquiry on the cost of the National Health Service (NHS). His investigation, which demonstrated that the NHS was actually very good value for money and needed further investment, has been described as "a minor classic of modern social analysis" (C. Webster, The Health Services Since the War Vol. 1, London, HMSO, 1988, p. 207). He was awarded a Cambridge PhD in 1955, and in the same year Titmuss appointed him as an assistant lecturer in his department at the LSE. He was promoted to lecturer in 1957, reader in social administration in 1961, and full professor in 1965. He retired in 1991, but returned to work part-time with Elias Mossialos to establish the LSE Health unit.

=== Research ===
Abel-Smith's research interests in health and social welfare were underpinned by his commitment to socialism. He focused on the impact of the new post-war British welfare state, publishing regular articles and books in the academic and mainstream press to highlight persistent inequalities in health and social welfare that Beveridge's model had not adequately addressed. His first publication was for the Fabian Society in 1953: "The Reform of Social Security". He collaborated with the sociologist Peter Townsend – who also moved to work with Titmuss at the LSE in 1957 – on projects on poverty, pensions and social security. They conducted a major study using a new method of constructing a poverty line that demonstrated that poverty had increased in Britain in the 1950s. Their 1965 book, The Poor and the Poorest, was used to launch the Child Poverty Action Group, which Abel-Smith remained closely involved with for the rest of his life.

Another of Abel-Smith's key research interests was the financing and development of health services. Following on from his work on the Guillebaud Report on the cost of the NHS, he was invited in 1958 to lead a multi-agency project for the World Health Organization on the costs of health care in six countries. He produced the first comparative classifications, which became the standard for reporting health care expenditure. Although his background was in economics, he was increasingly interested in the finance and management of health services. He gained first-hand experience of the British NHS through his appointment as a governor to a number of regional boards and London hospital management committees in the 1960s, including St Thomas' hospital.

His ideas on health and social welfare financing reflected his engagement with leading international health economists and social policy theorists such as Wilbur Cohen, Ida Merriam, Milton Roemer and Dorothy Rice, and he was frequently invited into expert advisory groups. He collaborated with Archie Cochrane in the early 1970s, resulting in his classic book Value for Money in the Health Services (1976), which explored strategies for cost containment, effectiveness and efficiency. As his experience through advising developing countries increased, he moved away from his ideological commitment to fully state-funded services, and embraced the concept of social insurance and, in the 1990s, the potential offered by user charges.

=== Political adviser ===
While at Cambridge, Abel-Smith had been identified by Hugh Dalton as a potential future Labour MP. He began political campaigning, but when he was offered the nomination for Dalton's safe seat in 1957 he turned it down, worried that if his homosexuality were revealed that it would cause embarrassment for his family. Instead he played a key role in modernising the Fabian Society and served it for 31 years as executive committee member, treasurer and vice-president. From the mid-1950s he served on various Labour Party working parties and committees, providing policy ideas on pensions and social security. The Fabian pamphlet he had co-authored with Townsend, "New Pensions for the Old", was used by Richard Crossman as the basis for a radical revision of Labour's social welfare system. When Crossman was appointed as Secretary of State for Social Services in 1968 he invited Abel-Smith to become his part-time adviser, one of the first such posts in British government. Abel-Smith advised issues including the re-structuring of the NHS and helped to set up an enquiry into the Ely Hospital scandal in Cardiff. When Labour lost the 1970 general election Crossman wrote in his diary that Abel-Smith "has been my closest personal friend and without him I could have done very little in the past two years".

When Labour returned to government in 1974 Abel-Smith was re-appointed as a special adviser by the new Secretary of State for Social Services, Barbara Castle. He helped her, and her successor David Ennals, to introduce a new pensions scheme - SERPS; set up the Resource Allocation Working Party [RAWP] to allocate NHS resources to regions according to health needs, and to set up the Black Report into inequalities in health. When he was working for Barbara Castle she appointed Jack Straw as political adviser. "Let me be clear", she said to Straw, "I have appointed Brian for his brilliance. I have appointed you for your low cunning." At the end of her cabinet career she wrote that "Brian's steady, informed and perceptive help is a tower of strength" (B. Castle, The Castle Diaries 1974–76, London, Weidenfeld & Nicolson, 1980, p. 721). In 1978, frustrated with tensions between the government, NHS and the medical profession, he accepted an offer to work as special adviser to Peter Shore, Secretary of State for the Environment, where he tackled housing and urban planning issues. After the defeat of Labour at the 1979 general election, Abel-Smith was asked by a number of health policy think thanks including the Kings Fund and the Nuffield Trust to advise on reforming aspects of British healthcare.

Abel-Smith's wider command of social policy included legal institutions. His capacity for penetrating, indeed adventurous, analysis led to one of the most original contributions to the role of law of the twentieth century. His book with Robert Stevens, Lawyers and the Courts (1967), was a sociological study of the English legal system from 1750 to 1965 which showed its social origins and mode of control and helped to make an unanswerable case for root-and-branch modernisation. The sequel, In Search of Justice (1968), demonstrated the failings of the legal system as a social service. He served on Citizens Advice Bureau committees and in 1973 he co-wrote with Michael Zander Legal Problems and the Citizen.

=== International expert adviser ===
Parallel to his academic post at LSE and his appointments as special adviser to Labour governments, Abel-Smith regularly worked as a freelance consultant for international organisations, including the World Health Organization, the International Labour Organization and the World Bank. One of the first of these missions (for the British government in collaboration with Richard Titmuss) was to Mauritius (1959–1961), where their controversial recommendation to introduce a family planning service was adopted. After his death the Mauritius government issued a set of commemorative stamps to mark his contribution to the establishment of the country's health service.

In 1976 he was invited to become a European Economic Community (EEC) adviser to the Directorate of Social Affairs. He worked closely with the Commissioner Henk Vredeling on establishing European standards for healthcare and social welfare, especially on controlling costs of pharmaceuticals. In the early 1980s he was appointed to lead the European response to the WHO global initiative Health for All by the Year 2000, and in 1984 he accepted an invitation from Halfdan Mahler, Director General of WHO, to become his personal adviser. During the 1980s and 1990s, Abel-Smith travelled widely to advise on country-level and regional policies. He continued to advocate policies based on socialist and egalitarian principles, which increasingly brought him into conflict with staff at the World Bank, whose neo-liberal ideology seemed to threaten core values of risk sharing and social capital in health and social welfare systems.

== Personal life ==
Abel-Smith met his partner, landscape gardener and part-time actor John Sarbutt, in 1960. They lived between London and Westwell, Kent, where they created a garden together. Abel-Smith was a cook and raconteur, and enjoyed skiing and swimming. In 1965 he founded an menswear business in Tryon Street, London, called Just Men. It was in business for nearly twenty years, expanding to a number of branches, including one in Philadelphia, with Abel-Smith and Sarbutt travelling each year to Italy to buy the latest styles. Regular customers included film stars and musicians the Rolling Stones, Joan Collins and Warren Beatty.

He died of carcinoma of the pancreas at his home in London, 10 Denbigh Street, Westminster, on 4 April 1996.

== Key publications ==
Twenty-five of his 37 books, and 98 of his 166 published articles and papers were on health.

- The Cost of the Health Service in England and Wales, with Richard Titmuss (1956)
- A History of the Nursing Profession (1960)
- Paying for Health Services (1963)
- The Hospitals, 1800–1948 (1964)
- An International Study of Health Expenditure (1967)
- Value for Money in Health Services (1976)
- National Health Service: the First 30 Years (1978)
- The Organisation, Financing and Cost of Health Care in the European Community (1979)
- Planning the Finances of the Health Sector (1984)
- An Introduction to Health: Policy, Planning and Financing (1994)

== References and further reading ==
- Sally Sheard, The Passionate Economist: how Brian Abel-Smith shaped global health and social welfare Bristol, Policy Press, November 2013.

Party political offices
Preceded by Mary Stewart	Chairman of the Fabian Society; 1963–1964	Succeeded by Tony Benn
Preceded by Michael Shanks	Treasurer of the Fabian Society; 1965–1968	Succeeded by Anthony Lester
Preceded by John Roper	Treasurer of the Fabian Society; 1981	Succeeded by Nick Butler
