= Enquiry into the Cost of the National Health Service =

1956 report of the UK Parliament

The Enquiry into the Cost of the National Health Service, known popularly as the Guillebaud Report, was a 1956 report of the Government of the United Kingdom into the financial efficiency of the National Health Service. The chair of the independent Committee of Enquiry, and lead author of the report, was the Cambridge economist C. W. Guillebaud.

== Background ==
The enquiry was called by the Conservative government and announced on 1 April 1953 by the then Health Minister, Iain Macleod. The National Health Service (NHS) had been established in 1948 and, in its first few years, costs had risen faster than anticipated. The independent enquiry would examine the long-term issues of funding the Service. The terms of reference were to examine the present and prospective financial situation of the NHS, to recommend structural changes that would improve efficiency, and to advise and recommend how the Service could maintain quality without escalating expense. Guillebaud had been Macleod's tutor at Cambridge.

== Committee ==
In addition to Guillebaud, the committee included:

- J. W. Cook, Professor of Chemistry at Glasgow University
- Anne Godwin, Assistant General Secretary of the Clerical and Administrative Workers' Union
- Sir John Maude, past Permanent Secretary of the Ministry of Health
- Sir Geoffrey Vickers of the National Coal Board

The Committee was appointed by Macleod and James Stuart, Secretary of State for Scotland. For statistical background, the committee used a memorandum published by Cambridge University Press: "The Cost of the National Health Service in England and Wales" by Brian Abel-Smith and Richard Titmuss.

== Findings ==
The published report found no extravagance or inefficiency beyond the inevitable imperfections of any organisation. It recommended no structural changes to the National Health Service. It found that the cost of the Service was not escalating as rapidly as had been feared, once inflation was taken into account. It called for more public funding for hospital modernisation, recommending £30 million pounds per year for seven years from 1958 onwards. It also recommended increased funding for community care.

The committee concluded that charges for dental treatment and for spectacles were undesirable. Citing the shortage of dentists, the report recommended keeping the dental charges but reducing the charges for spectacles as soon as resources allowed. The committee were divided about prescription charges that the Government had introduced in 1952. The report said that they "hindered the proper use of the Service by at least the great majority of its potential users" but still recommended that they be kept.

The committee rejected the idea that there was a natural limit to the demand on the NHS. Instead they argued that the "acceptable" level of performance would rise indefinitely: "The advance of medical science continually places new demands on the Service, and the standards expected by the public also continue to rise."

== Reaction ==
On its publication in 1956, Minister for Health Robin Turton told Parliament that the Government "broadly accepted" the conclusions of the Enquiry.

An editorial in The Times said the report might superficially seem to be "a bluebook full of hogwash" but that in fact the committee had "argued their case with considerable thoroughness."

It was at a dinner to celebrate the publication of the report that Aneurin Bevan (who as Minister of Health had introduced the NHS) remarked to Julian Tudor Hart that "ultimately I had to stuff their mouths with gold" about his handling of the hospital consultants during the founding of the NHS. The comment is often quoted as "I stuffed their mouths with gold".

== See also ==
- History of the National Health Service (England)
