= Gladys Turquet-Milnes =

Gladys Rosaleen Turquet-Milnes (21 April 1887 – 17 January 1977) was a British academic and author. She was Professor of French Language and Literature at Bedford College, University of London, from 1934 to 1952, having been Head of the French Department at Westfield College from 1916 to 1934.

Her obituary in The Times described her as "a remarkably effective teacher, who loved the literature she taught but not uncritically, and communicated her zest and her assessments with vitality and style". She published several scholarly books on French and Belgian writers, some of which have been reprinted in the 2010s, and a book of poems and an autobiographical work.

Turquet-Milnes was born in Wandsworth, Surrey, the daughter of Dr Alfred and Helena Emily Milnes. Her husband, André Turquet (1869-1940), ran Scoones' training school for the diplomatic service and was appointed an honorary CBE in 1936 for "his work in the services of Franco-British relations"; he predeceased her. Her son Dr Pierre Turquet (1913-1975), a psychiatrist and Olympic fencer, died in a traffic accident. She died in Sussex, aged 89. At the time of her death, Turquet-Milnes had three grandchildren and four great-grandchildren.

Her death notice in The Times uses the name "Gladys Mary Turquet", although she appears to have published as "Gladys Rosaleen Turquet-Milnes".

== Selected publications ==
- The influence of Baudelaire in France and England (1913) Reprinted 2015, ISBN 9781331550266
- Some Modern Belgian Writers: a critical study (1916) Reprinted 2016, ISBN 9781333531324
- Some Modern French Writers: A study in Bergsonism (1921) Reprinted 2016, ISBN 9781539532569
- From Pascal to Proust, studies in the genealogy of a philosophy (1926)
- Poems (1928, Jonathan Cape)
- Paul Valéry (1934)
- Apples I Have Picked (Dent, 1939) Autobiography, described as "Life in the Loire Valley and Sussex; farming, country life and people"
