= Hilary Graham =

British sociologist

Professor Hilary Graham CBE FBA
- Born: 1950 (age 75–76)
- Title: Professor of Health Sciences
- Awards: Commander of the Order of the British Empire (2014); Fellow of the British Academy (2016)

Academic background
- Education: University of York
- Thesis: Having a baby: women's experiences of pregnancy, childbirth and early motherhood (1980)

Hilary Mavis Graham, CBE, FBA (born 1950) is a British sociologist and social policy academic, who specialises in public health. Since 2005, she has been Professor of Health Sciences at the University of York. She previously lectured at the University of Bradford, the Open University, Coventry Polytechnic, the University of Warwick, and Lancaster University.

== Early life and education ==
In 1968, Graham matriculated into the University of York to study sociology. She then completed Bachelor of Arts (BA), Master of Arts (MA), and Doctor of Philosophy (DPhil) degrees. Her doctoral thesis, which was completed in 1980, was titled "Having a baby: women's experiences of pregnancy, childbirth and early motherhood".

== Academic career ==
Graham began her academic career as a lecturer in social policy at the University of Bradford. She then moved to the Open University, where she was a researcher in the Faculty of Social Sciences. In the 1980s, she joined Coventry Polytechnic as Head of its Applied Social Studies Department. From 1988 to 1996, she was Professor of Applied Social Studies at the University of Warwick. She then worked at Lancaster University, before joining the University of York as Professor of Health Sciences in October 2005.

From 1996 to 2001, Graham was Director of the ESRC Health Variations Programme. She was a member of the Independent Inquiry into Inequalities in Health which reported in 1998. From 2005 to 2011, she was Director of the Department of Health's Public Health Research Consortium.

== Honours ==
In the 2014 Queen's Birthday Honours, Graham was appointed a Commander of the Order of the British Empire (CBE) "for services to Public Health Research". In July 2016, she was elected a Fellow of the British Academy (FBA), the UK's national academy for the humanities and the social sciences.

== Selected works ==
- Graham, Hilary (1984). Women, health, and the family. Brighton: Wheatsheaf Books. ISBN 978-0710807328.
- Graham, Hilary (1992). Health and welfare. Walton-on-Thames: Nelson. ISBN 9780174385080.
- Graham, Hilary (1993). Hardship and health in women's lives. New York: Harvester Wheatsheaf. ISBN 9780745012643.
- Graham, Hilary (1993). When life's a drag: women, smoking and disadvantage. London: HMSO. ISBN 9780113216253.
- Graham, Hilary, ed. (2001). Understanding health inequalities (1st ed.). Buckingham: Open University Press. ISBN 9780335205547.
- Graham, Hilary (2007). Unequal lives: Health and socioeconomic inequalities. Maidenhead: Open University Press. ISBN 9780335213696.
- Graham, Hilary, ed. (2009). Understanding health inequalities (2nd ed.). Maidenhead: Open University Press. ISBN 9780335234592.
