= Douglas Black (physician) =

Sir Douglas Andrew Kilgour Black (29 May 1913 – 13 September 2002) was a Scottish physician and medical scientist who played a key role in the development of the National Health Service. He conducted research in the field of public health and was famous as the author of the Black Report. He was also known for the Black Formula, a translation of the Pignet formula to British measurements.

He was born in Delting Shetland in 1913, educated at Forfar Academy, and studied medicine at the Bute Medical School, University of St Andrews, graduating with MB ChB in 1933.

He conducted research into water loss and dehydration, first at Oxford University, and then at the University of Manchester, where he became professor of medicine in 1959.

In 1974 he became the first chief scientist at the Department of Health and Social Security of the UK government. From 1977 to 1983 he was president of the Royal College of Physicians. He also served as the president of the British Medical Association and took an uncompromising stand against the apartheid regime in South Africa.

In the 1970s Black was asked by the Labour government of the UK to chair an expert committee to investigate health inequalities. The report produced by this committee, popularly known as "The Black Report" was published in 1980. Although unpopular with the then Conservative government, it has had a major impact on knowledge on the subject of health inequality since that time, and was published by Penguin Books as Inequalities in Health: The Black Report and the Health Divide in 1982.

Later, Black chaired the UK government investigation into childhood leukaemia around the nuclear reprocessing plant at Sellafield, Cumbria, England.

Black was created a Knight Bachelor in 1973, and a Knight of the Most Venerable Order of St John of Jerusalem in 1989.

== Interviews ==
- Sir Douglas Black in interview with Sir Gordon Wolstenholme, 1987, held at Oxford Brookes University

Academic offices
Preceded by Sir Cyril Clarke	President of the Royal College of Physicians; 1977–1983	Succeeded by Raymond Hoffenberg
