= Donald Acheson =

British physician and epidemiologist (1926–2010)

Sir Donald Acheson KBE FRCS FRCP
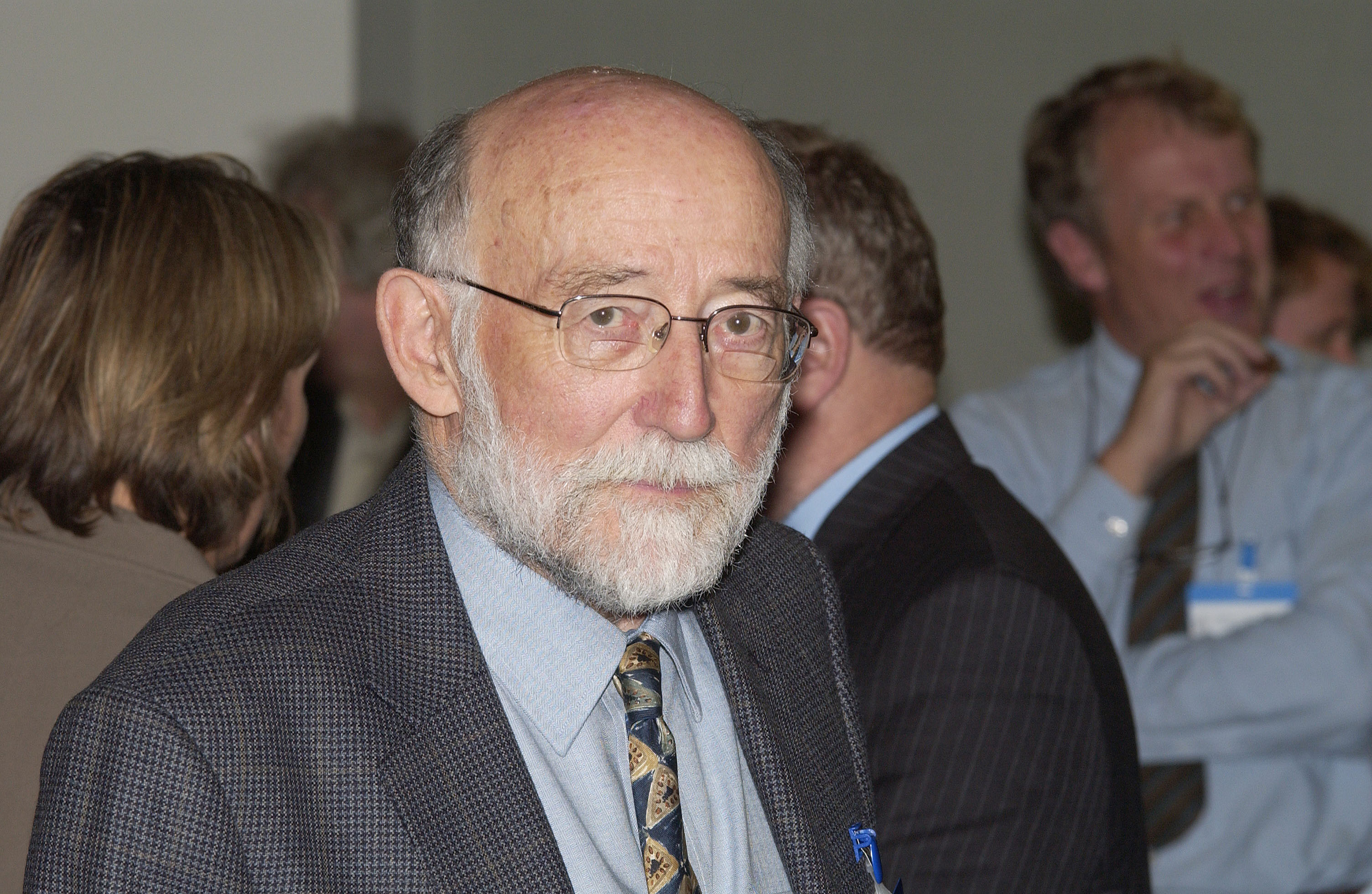
- Acheson in 2004

Chief Medical Officer for England
- In office 1 January 1983 – 31 December 1990
- Preceded by: Henry Yellowlees
- Succeeded by: Kenneth Calman

Personal details
- Born: 17 September 1926 Belfast, Northern Ireland
- Died: 10 January 2010 (aged 83)
- Education: University of Oxford
- Profession: Epidemiologist

Sir Ernest Donald Acheson KBE FRCS FRCP (17 September 1926 – 10 January 2010) was a British physician and epidemiologist who served as Chief Medical Officer of the United Kingdom from 1983 to 1991. He was born in Belfast, Northern Ireland.

== Early life ==
Acheson was born in Belfast on 17 September 1926. His father, Captain Malcolm King Acheson, MC, MD, was a doctor who specialised in public health, and his mother, Dorothy Josephine (née Rennoldson), was the daughter of a Tyneside ship builder. He was educated at Merchiston Castle School, Brasenose College, Oxford (MA, DM, Fellow 1968, Honorary Fellow 1991). His elder brother, Roy Acheson (also Merchiston and Brasenose alumnus), was Emeritus Professor of Community Medicine in the University of Cambridge and Fellow of Churchill College.

== Career ==
Acheson studied medicine at the Middlesex Hospital, where he was a Broderip scholar. Having qualified in 1951, he practised at Middlesex Hospital and then entered the Royal Air Force Medical Branch, achieving the rank of Acting Squadron Leader (1953–55).

From 1957 until 1968 he worked at the University of Oxford, as Fellow of University College (1957–59), medical tutor in the Nuffield Department of Medicine at Radcliffe Infirmary (1960), Director of the Oxford Record Linkage Study and Unit of Clinical Epidemiology (1962–68), and May Reader in Medicine (1965).

His association with the University of Southampton began in 1963 when he was appointed Professor of Clinical Epidemiology in the university and Honorary Consultant Physician at Royal South Hampshire Hospital. He held both positions until 1983. In 1968 he became the first Dean of the new Medical School at the University of Southampton, serving in that capacity until 1978. In 1977 he was Visiting Professor at McMaster University.

From 1979 until 1983 he was Director of the Medical Research Council Unit in Environmental Epidemiology.

He then became Chief Medical Officer (1983–1991), serving the British government in the Department of Health, Department of Social Security, Department of Education and Science, and Home Office. During his time as Chief Medical Officer, he smuggled copies of The Advocate and New York Native into Britain in diplomatic bags to avoid them being seized by customs so that he could keep abreast of developments relating to HIV/AIDS.

After leaving office as Chief Medical Officer he held positions at the London School of Hygiene and Tropical Medicine and University College London.

In 1997 he was commissioned by the new Blair government to chair the Independent Inquiry into Inequalities in Health, which led to the publication of the eponymous Acheson Report. In 1998 he delivered the Harveian Oration to the Royal College of Physicians.

Acheson was President of the Association of Physicians of Great Britain and Ireland (1979) and the British Medical Association (1996–97). He was a Fellow of the Royal College of Physicians (FRCP), Royal College of Surgeons of England (FRCS), Royal College of Obstetricians and Gynaecologists (FRCOG), Faculty of Public Health Medicine (FFPHM), and Faculty of Occupational Medicine (FFOM). In 1986 he was appointed Knight Commander of the Most Excellent Order of the British Empire. He held honorary doctorates from the University of Southampton (DM 1984), University of Newcastle (DSc 1984), Queen's University of Belfast (MD 1987), University of Aberdeen (LLD 1988), University of Nottingham (MD 1989), University of Birmingham (MD 1991), University of Salford (DSc 1991), and University of Ulster (DSc 1994).

== Autobiography ==
- One Doctor's Odyssey – the Social Lesion (2007). ISBN 978-1-84549-276-2. (Abramis Academic Press).
