= Michael Shanks (journalist) =

British economic journalist

Michael James Shanks (12 April 1927, London – 13 January 1984, London) was a British economic journalist.

Throughout the 1950s, Shanks was a writer and editor at the Financial Times, and in 1964/5 he became the economic correspondent with the Sunday Times. His Penguin Special book The Stagnant Society (1961) sold 60,000 copies.

== Books ==
- The Stagnant Society. Harmondsworth 1961

Party political offices
Preceded by Jack Diamond	Treasurer of the Fabian Society; 1964–1965	Succeeded by Brian Abel-Smith
