= Michael Marmot =

British medicine and public health academic (born 1945)

Professor Sir Michael Marmot CH FRCP FFPM FMedSci FBA
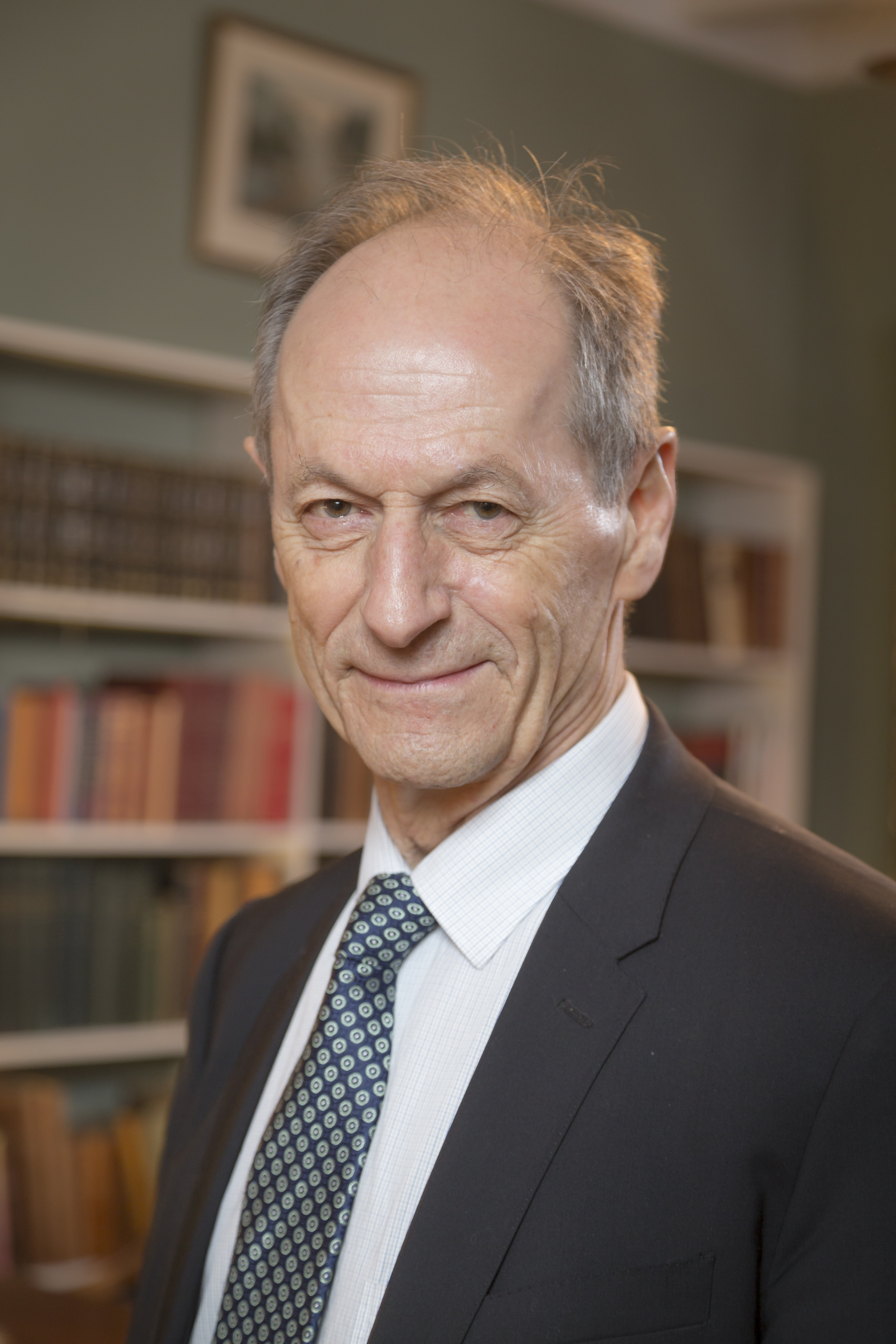
- Born: Michael Gideon Marmot; 26 January 1945 (age 81); London, England
- Education: University of Sydney (MBBS); University of California, Berkeley (PhD)
- Known for: Social determinants of health; Health equity; Whitehall Studies; President of the British Medical Association (2010-2011); President of the World Medical Association (2015-2016)
- Spouse: Alexandra Naomi Ferster
- Awards: Knight Bachelor (2000); Balzan Prize (2004); Harveian Oration (2006); Jenner Medal of the Royal Society of Medicine (2010); Prince Mahidol Award (2015); Member of the Order of the Companions of Honour (2022)
- Scientific career
- Fields: Epidemiology
- Workplaces: University College, London; UCL Institute of Health Equity, London
- Thesis: Acculturation and Coronary Heart Disease in Japanese-Americans (1975)

Sir Michael Gideon Marmot (born 26 January 1945) is professor of epidemiology and public health at University College London (UCL), director of the UCL Institute of Health Equity, advisor to the Director-General of the World Health Organisation (WHO) on social determinants of health, and a leading researcher in the field of health inequalities. He leads the English Longitudinal Study of Ageing (ELSA) and is a former president of the British Medical Association and the World Medical Association.

Marmot is known for using epidemiological studies to investigate how social, cultural and environmental factors influence health. His early studies found that Japanese-American men who maintained traditional Japanese lifestyles had lower rates of heart disease, while research on French migrants suggested that health related behaviours may continue after migration. His work found that unlike Irish migrants, Italian, Polish and Caribbean male migrants had lower overall death rates than people in their countries of origin, suggesting that healthier individuals may have been more likely to migrate. Later, his Whitehall II study showed that lower ranking civil servants had poorer health and higher death rates than senior employees, highlighting the link between socioeconomic status and health inequalities. He subsequently served on the Scientific Advisory Group of the "Independent Inquiry into Inequalities in Health" chaired by Sir Donald Acheson, the former UK chief medical officer.

Marmot's awards and honours include around 20 honorary doctorates, the Balzan Prize (2004) for epidemiology, the Harveian Oration (2006), the Jenner Medal of the Royal Society of Medicine (2010), and the Prince Mahidol Award (2015) for public health. In the 2023 New Year Honours he was appointed a Member of the Order of the Companions of Honour for services to public health. His publications include Fair Society, Healthy Lives (2010), The Health Gap: The Challenge of an Unequal World (2015), The Status Syndrome: How your social standing directly affects your health and life expectancy (2015), and Health Equity in England: The Marmot Review 10 Years On (2020).

== Early life and education ==
Michael Marmot was born in London on 26 January 1945. When he was a young child, his family moved to Sydney in Australia, where he attended Sydney Boys High School between 1957 and 1961. In either 1968 or 1969 he graduated with an MBBS medical degree from the University of Sydney.

Marmot earned a MPH degree in 1972. He gained a PhD in 1975 from the University of California, Berkeley for research into acculturation and coronary heart disease in Japanese Americans.

== Career ==
Marmot was a member of the Royal Commission on Environmental Pollution for six years and in the New Year Honours 2000 he was knighted by Queen Elizabeth II, for services to epidemiology and the understanding of health inequalities.

Marmot advised the WHO. He was chair of the Commission on Social Determinants of Health (CSDH), which was set up by the World Health Organization 2005, and in August 2008 he produced for the commission a report called Closing the Gap in a Generation.

He leads the English Longitudinal Study of Ageing (ELSA), and is engaged in several international research efforts on the social determinants of health. He served as president of the British Medical Association (BMA) from 2010 to 2011, and is the new president of the British Lung Foundation.

Marmot served as president of the World Medical Association for 2015–16. During his tenure he faced calls to eject the Israeli Medical Association (IMA) from the World Medical Association, owing to the evidence of Israeli doctors complicity with the torture of Palestinians. He received criticism for not only refusing to eject the IMA but also accepting the IMA's stated commitment to medical ethics without investigating any of the torture claims.

Marmot was elected member of the Academia Europaea in 1995.

Marmot was appointed Member of the Order of the Companions of Honour (CH) in the 2023 New Year Honours for services to public health.

=== Memberships ===
Marmot was elected as a fellow of the Royal College of Physicians (FRCP) in 1989. He became a fellow of the Faculty of Public Health (FFPHM) in 1989, a fellow of the Academy of Medical Sciences (FMedSci) in 1998, and was elected an honorary fellow of the British Academy (Hon FBA) also in 2008.

He has been furthermore elected an honorary fellow of the Royal Society of Public Health (Hon FRSPH) in 2008, an honorary fellow of the Royal College of Psychiatrists (Hon FRCPsych) in 2013, and an honorary fellow of the Faculty of Public Health (Hon FFPH).

In 2023 he was elected to the American Philosophical Society.

== Research ==
Marmot's epidemiological studies have investigated how social, cultural and environmental factors influence health. In the 1970s he led research that found that Japanese-American men who retained traditional Japanese cultural practices had lower rates of coronary heart disease than those who adopted more Western lifestyles. The most Westernised group had three to five times higher rates of heart disease, even after accounting for major risk factors such as diet, cholesterol, blood pressure and smoking. The disease patterns became reversed after adopting lifestyle, stress and diet changes.

In 1984, Marmot noted that motor vehicle accident deaths were common in both France and French migrants living in England, suggesting that behaviours or cultural influences from their home country may continue after migration. In the same year he published his study that found that unlike the Irish migrants, Italian, Polish and Caribbean male migrants had lower overall death rates than people in their countries of origin, suggesting that healthier individuals may have been more likely to migrate.

Between 1985 and 1988, Marmot led the second Whitehall Study, which examined the health of over 10,000 middle aged British civil servants across 20 Whitehall departments. The study found that employees in lower grades had poorer health, higher rates of angina and chronic bronchitis, and higher death rates than those in senior positions. These inequalities were associated with differences in lifestyle, income, working conditions and social support, highlighting the influence of socioeconomic circumstances on health and life expectancy.

His department includes the MRC National Survey of Health & Development, a longitudinal study directed by Professor Michael Wadsworth of people born in Britain in 1946 and followed up since. There are 120 other academic staff in the department.

He served on the Scientific Advisory Group of the Independent Inquiry into Inequalities in Health chaired by Sir Donald Acheson, the former UK chief medical officer. This reported in November 1998.

In The Status Syndrome: How your social standing directly affects your health and life expectancy, he argues that socio-economic position is an important determinant for health outcomes. This result holds even if we control for the effects of income, education and risk factors (such as smoking) on health. The causal pathway Marmot identifies concerns the psychic benefits of "being in control" of one's life. Autonomy in this sense is related to our socio-economic position. Based on comparative studies, Marmot argues that we can make our society more participatory and inclusive to increase overall public health.

In 2008, Marmot appeared in Unnatural Causes: Is Inequality Making Us Sick?, an American documentary series examining the social determinants of health that drew heavily from Marmot's work on the Whitehall Studies.

In November 2008, Marmot was asked by the Secretary of State for Health to chair an independent review of health inequalities in England, tasked with proposing the most effective evidence based strategies for reducing them after 2010. The review reported in February 2010 as Fair Society, Healthy Lives.

In 2020, Marmot co-authored Health Equity in England: The Marmot Review 10 Years On. It found that life expectancy is falling among the poorest people and particularly amongst women in certain English regions. Published in the same year, Build Back Fairer: The COVID-19 Marmot Review explored connections between inequality in socioeconomic conditions and COVID-19 death tolls, recommending investing in public health. In 2021, a follow-up report looking at Greater Manchester noted a greater fall in life expectancy in the poorer areas of the county. It made recommendations around improving living standards, working conditions and increasing prospects for young people.

In 2022, Marmot warned of the risk of "a humanitarian crisis" the next winter caused by "fuel poverty", which could have long-term consequences mostly for the young and least well-off.

== Selected publications ==
=== Books ===
- Marmot, Michael (2015). The Health Gap: The Challenge of an Unequal World. Vol. 386. Bloomsbury. pp. 2442–4. doi:10.1016/S0140-6736(15)00150-6. ISBN 978-1-4088-5799-1. PMID 26364261. S2CID 27066898.
- Marmot, Michael (2015). The Status Syndrome: How Social Standing Affects Our Health and Longevity. Bloomsbury. ISBN 978-1-4088-7268-0.
- Marmot, Michael; Wilkinson, Richard G. (2006) [1999]. Social Determinants of Health (2nd ed.). Oxford/New York: Oxford University Press. ISBN 978-0-19-856589-5.
- Marmot, Michael; Siegrist, Johannes (2006). Social Inequalities in Health: new evidence and policy implications. Oxford/New York: Oxford University Press. ISBN 978-0-19-856816-2.
- Marmot, Michael (2004). The Status Syndrome: How Social Standing Affects Our Health and Longevity. New York: Times Books. ISBN 978-0-8050-7370-6.
- Marmot, Michael; Wilkinson, Richard G. (2003). The Solid Facts. Copenhagen: World Health Organization, Regional Office for Europe. ISBN 978-0-585-49252-0.

=== Journal articles and reports ===
- Marmot, M (2021) Build Back Fairer in Greater Manchester
- Marmot, M (2020) et al. Health Equity in England: The Marmot Review 10 Years On
- Marmot, M (2010). Fair society, healthy lives : the Marmot review; strategic review of health inequalities in England post-2010
- Boseley, S (2008). "Michael Marmot: Leader in the social determinants of health". The Lancet. 372 (9650): 1625. doi:10.1016/S0140-6736(08)61675-X. PMID 18994652. S2CID 13557445.
- Marmot, M (2008). "Michael Marmot on eliminating social injustice". The Health Service Journal: 15. PMID 19018626.
- Hemingway, H; Marmot, M (1999). "Evidence based cardiology: Psychosocial factors in the aetiology and prognosis of coronary heart disease. Systematic review of prospective cohort studies". BMJ (Clinical Research Ed.). 318 (7196): 1460–67. doi:10.1136/bmj.318.7196.1460. PMC 1115843. PMID 10346775.
- Marmot, MG (1997). "Contribution of job control and other risk factors to social variations in coronary heart disease incidence". The Lancet. 350 (9073): 235–39. Bibcode:1997Lanc..350..235M. doi:10.1016/S0140-6736(97)04244-X. PMID 9242799. S2CID 5665244.
- McKeigue, P.M.; Shah, B; Marmot, M.G. (1991). "Relation of central obesity and insulin resistance with high diabetes prevalence and cardiovascular risk in South Asians". Lancet. 337 (8738): 382–86. doi:10.1016/0140-6736(91)91164-p. PMID 1671422. S2CID 21350831.
- Marmot, M. G.; Adelstein, A. M.; Bulusu, L. (30 June 1984). "Lessons from the study of immigrant mortality". Lancet. 1 (8392): 1455–1457. doi:10.1016/s0140-6736(84)91943-3. ISSN 0140-6736. PMID 6145889.
- Marmot, M. G.; Syme, S. L. (September 1976). "Acculturation and coronary heart disease in Japanese-Americans". American Journal of Epidemiology. 104 (3): 225–247. doi:10.1093/oxfordjournals.aje.a112296. ISSN 0002-9262. PMID 961690.

== Awards and honours ==
- 2024 Honorary Doctor of Medicine by the University of St Andrews
- 2023 Appointed a Member of the Order of the Companions of Honour for services to public health, 2023 New Year Honours
- 2021 Outstanding Contribution to Health Award, The BMJ
- 2021 Good Governance Award, Good Governance Institute
- 2019 Global Hero Award, World Health Organization
- 2019 Elected Foreign Fellow, Brazilian Academy of Medicine
- 2017 Gold Medal, Royal Society of Medicine
- 2017 Distinguished Merit gold medal, British Medical Association
- 2016 Awarded an honorary doctorate by the Norwegian University of Science and Technology (NTNU).
- 2015 Prince Mahidol Award for public health
- 2015 C.-E. A. Winslow Medal, Yale
- 2012 Lifetime Award Fellowship Eur Academy of Occupational Health Psychology
- 2012 Patron of Students for Global Health
- 2012 European Academy of Occupational Health Psychology Fellowship
- 2011 Ambuj Nath Bose Prize, Royal College of Physicians
- 2011 Medal of City of Lima, awarded by Mayor of Lima
- 2011 Sir Liam Donaldson Lecture and Medal, Health Protection Agency
- 2011 Fellow, Association for Psychological Medicine
- 2011 Avedis Donabedian International Foundation Award
- 2010 Manchester Doubleday Award, Manchester School of Medicine
- 2010 Jenner Medal, Royal Society of Medicine
- 2010–11 President, British Medical Association
- 2008 Tore Andersson Award in Epidemiological Research, Karolinska Institutet,
- 2008 William B. Graham Prize for Health Services Research
- 2007 Centre for Disease Control (CDC) Foundation Hero Award
- 2006 Winner BMA Book Awards 2006 (Public Health)
- 2006 Harveian Oration, Royal College of Physicians
- 2004 Balzan Prize for Epidemiology
- 2004 Alwyn Smith Prize Medal for distinguished service to public health, Faculty of Public Health
- 2004 Bisset Hawkins Medal, Royal College of Physicians
- 2003 Visiting Fellow Commoner, Trinity College, Cambridge
- 2002 Decade of Behaviour Distinguished Speaker, Gerontological Society of America
- 2002 Patricia B Barchas Award, American Psychosomatic Society
