= Margaret Whitehead =

British public health official

Dame Margaret Whitehead DBE
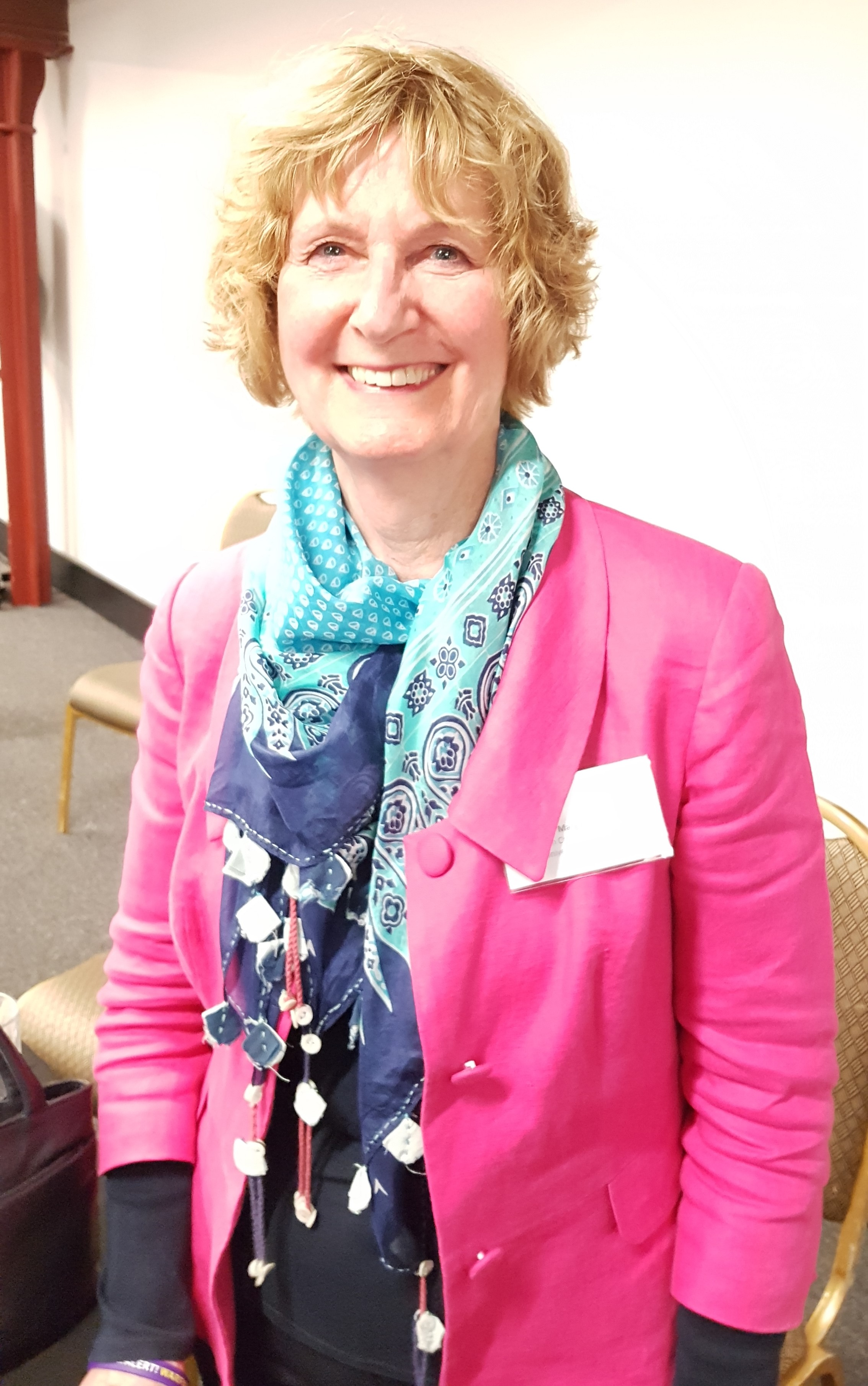
- Born: Margaret McRae Whitehead; 28 September 1948 (age 77); Liverpool, England
- Occupation: Professor in Public Health

Dame Margaret McRae Whitehead DBE (born 28 September 1948) holds the W.H. Duncan chair in Public Health at the University of Liverpool. She heads the World Health Organization Collaborating Centre for Policy Research on the Social Determinants of Health.

Whitehead has published extensively on the effects of social equality on health and also the social consequences of chronic ill health. She has advised on government policy and has written reports for the WHO on tackling inequalities in health.

She is also an associate editor for the Cochrane Public Health Review Group since 2008 and has a visiting Professorship at the Karolinska Institute.

== Honours ==
Whitehead was appointed Dame Commander of the Order of the British Empire (DBE) in the 2016 New Year Honours for services to public health. She was elected a Fellow of the Academy of Medical Sciences in 2017.

== Research ==
Longstanding research interests have been the assessment of policies and strategies to tackle inequalities in health and in health care. The current research programme that Margaret Whitehead leads focuses on the social dimensions of ill-health. In particular it traces social pathways to and from health inequalities and what this means for developing more effective health and social policy. The programme explores not only the social causes of ill health, but also the adverse consequences of having a chronic illness, such as reduced income and employment chances, social isolation and stigma in relation to specific tracer conditions. With international collaborators, her studies are looking at the ways in which health and social welfare systems themselves reduce or exacerbate the adverse consequences of ill-health and what can be done to improve the situation. She is keenly involved in knowledge transfer: finding ways for research evidence to get to where it can be most useful in informing policy-making and public health practice.
