= James Macdonald (civil servant) =

James Macdonald, CBE, FRSE (3 August 1898 – 28 April 1963) was a British civil servant and forester.

Born on 3 August 1898, Macdonald attended Blairgowrie High School from 1903 to 1915, then served in the Royal Flying Corps during the First World War. On demobilisation, he read for a BSc in forestry at the University of Edinburgh, graduating in 1923.

Macdonald entered the Forestry Commission in 1924 and worked as a researcher. He was appointed Research Officer, England and Wales, in 1932 and that year became a lecturer at the Imperial Forestry Institute. In 1936, he was appointed a divisional officer in the Forestry Commission but was placed on secondment at the wartime Ministry of Supply from 1939 to 1945; he was in charge of timber supply operations for East Anglia, then Nottinghamshire and later north-east Scotland.

Returning to the Forestry Commission, in 1946 Macdonald was appointed Conservator and worked in the Director of Forestry for Scotland's office. In 1948, he became the commission's Director of Research and Education. He was appointed a Commander of the Order of the British Empire (CBE) for his services in the 1953 New Year Honours and served as president of the International Union of Forest Research Organizations from 1956 to 1961, alongside his work with the Forestry Commission. He was elected a Fellow of the Royal Society of Edinburgh in 1957. From 1960 to 1962, he was acting Deputy Director-General of the commission during Sir Henry Beresford-Peirse's secondment to the UN Food and Agriculture Organization. (Note: Several reports noted that he had been Deputy Director-General since 1960, however The Times reported in 1959 that Macdonald would only be acting as Deputy Director-General during Beresford-Peirse's absence, and this is supported by the Forestry Commission's annual report for 1960–61, which states that he was "acting in the absence of Sir Henry Beresford-Peirse".) In 1962, when Beresford-Peirse returned and became Director-General, Macdonald was promoted to substantive Deputy Director-General. He retained responsibility for research in this role. He retired on 31 January 1963 and died on 28 April 1963. After his retirement, the commission's forestry research was reorganised; the post of Chief Research Officer was abolished and responsibility for research was given to the post of Director of Research (occupied by Andrew Watt), while the management section was transferred to the commission's headquarters.

Government offices
Preceded by Sir Henry Beresford-Peirse	Deputy Director-General of the Forestry Commission; 1962–1963	Succeeded by George Ryle
