= Claude Guillebaud =

British economist and public servant

Claude William Guillebaud
- Born: 2 July 1890; The Rectory, Yatesbury, Wiltshire
- Died: 23 August 1971 (aged 81); Cambridge, England
- Education: Repton School; Victoria University of Manchester; St John's College, Cambridge
- Occupations: Economist; academic; civil servant
- Known for: The Economic Recovery of Germany (1939); Variorum edition of Alfred Marshall's Principles of Economics (1961); Chairman of the Enquiry into the Cost of the National Health Service (known as the Guillebaud Report) (1953–56); Chairman of the Committee of Inquiry on Railway Pay (1958–60); Economic Survey on the Economy of the Falkland Islands (1967)
- Spouse: Austrian Marie-Thérèse (Pauline) Prunner (m. 1918)
- Relatives: The Rev. Ernest Delabere Guillebaud (1856–1907) (father); Mabel Louisa Marshall (1850–1912) (mother); Alfred Marshall (maternal uncle); Walter Guillebaud (brother)

Claude William Guillebaud CBE (2 July 1890 – 23 August 1971) was an influential British economist, at the Faculty of Economics, University of Cambridge.

== Family ==
Claude Guillebaud (which is pronounced to rhyme with "keel-bow") was born on 2 July 1890 at The Rectory, Yatesbury, Wiltshire, to The Rev. Ernest Delabere Guillebaud (1856–1907) and Mabel Louisa Marshall (1850–1912), who was the younger sister of Alfred Marshall.

His mother Mabel had been prevented from marrying into the British Army by her "tyrant" father. Claude said in a letter to John Maynard Keynes that, after his mother chose to marry Ernest Guillebaud, "the old gentleman [Mabel's father] hated him and made things as difficult as possible for him, solely because he had married my mother."

Guillebaud married the Austrian Marie-Thérèse (Pauline) Prunner in 1918: and they had two daughters. He was appointed a Commander of the Order of the British Empire in the 1948 New Year Honours lists. He died in Cambridge from a prolonged illness on 23 August 1971.

=== Education ===
Like his twin brother, the forester Walter, Claude was educated at Repton School, the Victoria University of Manchester, and St John's College, Cambridge, where, unlike Walter, he studied economics, in which he won first-class honours in both parts of the tripos and received the Adam Smith Prize for best undergraduate-essay.

== Academic career ==
=== Academic positions ===
In 1915 he was made a fellow of St John's College Camrbridge, and, after his return from the civil service at the end of World War I, he became one of its supervisors in economics. He was appointed a director of studies there from 1935, taught economics there until his retirement in 1956, and served as a senior tutor there from 1952, succeeding Sir James Wordie. He also taught French, in which he was the tutor of the choral musician Peter Stanley Lyons between 1948 and 1950.

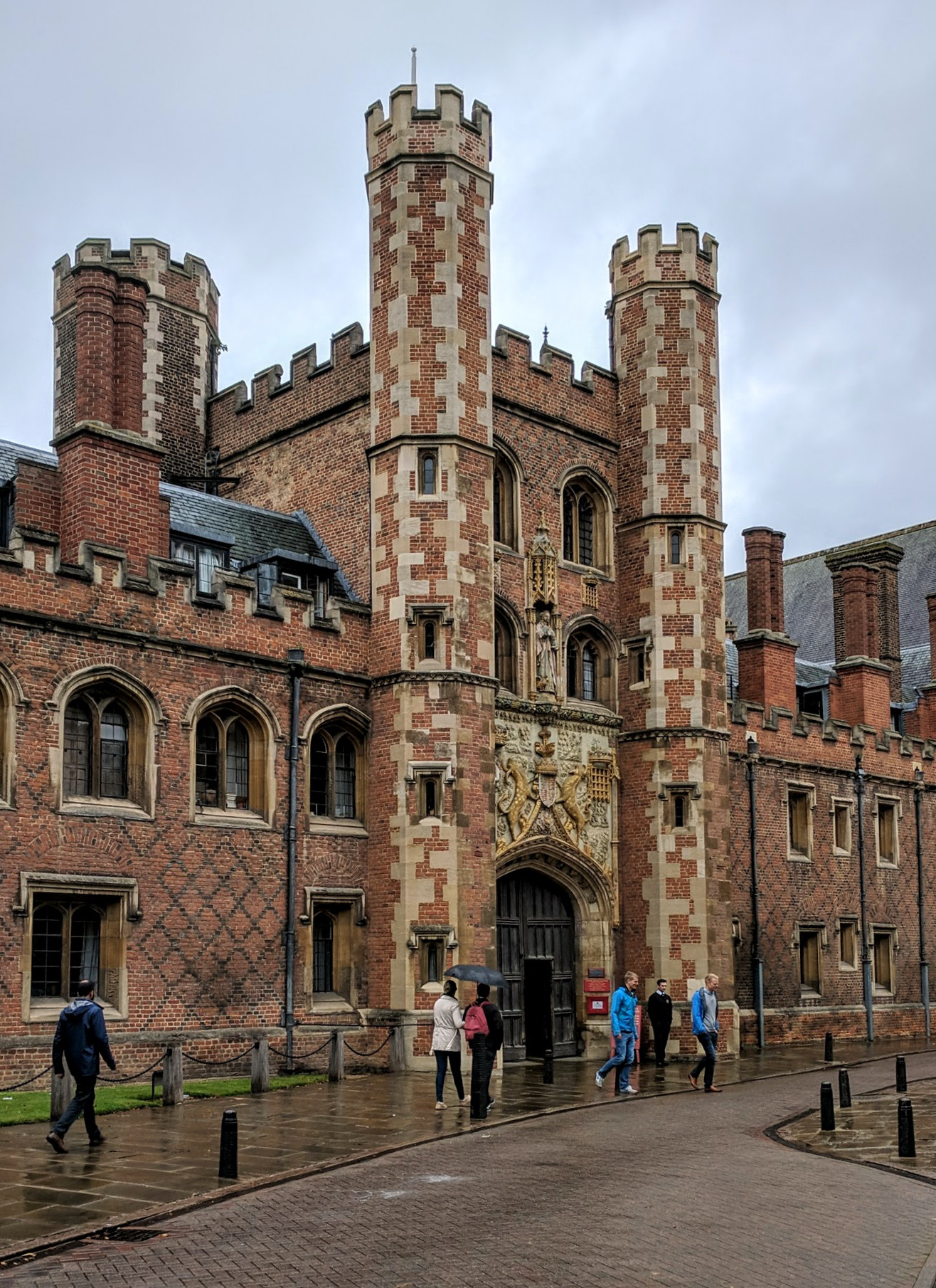
Guillebaud taught for most of his life at St John's College, Cambridge

At university level, he was appointed a lecturer in economics in 1926, Girdlers Lecturer in 1945, and reader in economics in 1956. David A. Collard considers Guillebaud to have been one of the "serious economists" at the university, alongside J. M. Keynes, A. C. Pigou, G. F. Shove and Frederick Lavington.

=== Academic works ===
Guillebaud did not have any national profile until the 1930s. His first book, on German works-councils, reoriented his studies towards post-imperial Germany, but was not influential. However, his next book, The Economic Recovery of Germany (1939), contentiously argued that Hitler's Third Reich recovered more effectively from the Great Depression than its rivals, and earned him a reputation for intellectual honesty and for willingness to state uncomfortable truths.

During the Second World War, Guillebaud published a volume on the social policy of Nazi Germany, after which he edited the Cambridge Economic Handbooks after the death of J. M. Keynes. In 1961, he published a highly influential variorum edition of his uncle Alfred Marshall's Principles of Economics, which had been encouraged by Keynes and took Guillebaud 27 years to complete to its final edition.

== Public service ==
From 1946, Guillebaud had public offices as an arbitrator in industrial-wage disputes, and as chairman of Courts of Inquiry and of special committees, and as a member of Wages Boards. He was chair of both the Enquiry into the Cost of the National Health Service (known as the Guillebaud Report) (1953–56) and the Committee of Inquiry on Railway Pay (1958–60). In the latter office, he concluded that the railwaymen had "genuine grounds for complaint" about their wages, of which he supported a rise of 5% and the possibility for another later increase. The Times, in a summary of these offices, described Guillebaud as a man of "humility, patience and good humour", with the ability to "withdraw and consider the problem from a scholarly distance".

Guillebaud's last public duty, in 1967, was to author an economic survey of the Falkland Islands, which led him to move to Stanley, Falkland Islands, for a month, at the request of its Governor Cosmo Haskard. He made many recommendations, including an expansion of the numbers of cattle kept on sheep-farms, an increase in the taxation of profits, and improvements in education at both primary and secondary level. He finished his report with a warning for the future:

I wish to express my personal belief and faith in the viability of the Falkland Islands' economy. But resolute action will be needed if a situation, which today is merely somewhat precarious, is to be prevented from reaching a stage when it becomes irreparable. It is not too much to say that the whole future of the Colony is now at stake.

== Selected publications ==
- The Works Council: A German Experiment in Industrial Democracy (1928)
- (contributor) Cambridge History of the British Empire, 2nd vol. (1929)
- The Economic Recovery of Germany, 1933–1938 (1939)
- The Social Policy of Nazi Germany (1941)
- The Wages Council System in Great Britain (1958)
- Economic Survey of the Sisal Industry of Tanganyika (1959)
- Art and Economics in Cambridge (1960)
- (editor) Principles of Economics by Alfred Marshall (1961)
- Wage Determination and Wages Policy, 2nd ed. (1967)
- The Role of the Arbitrator in Industrial Wage Disputes (1970)
