= Richard Titmuss =

British sociologist (1907–1973)

Richard Titmuss CBE FBA
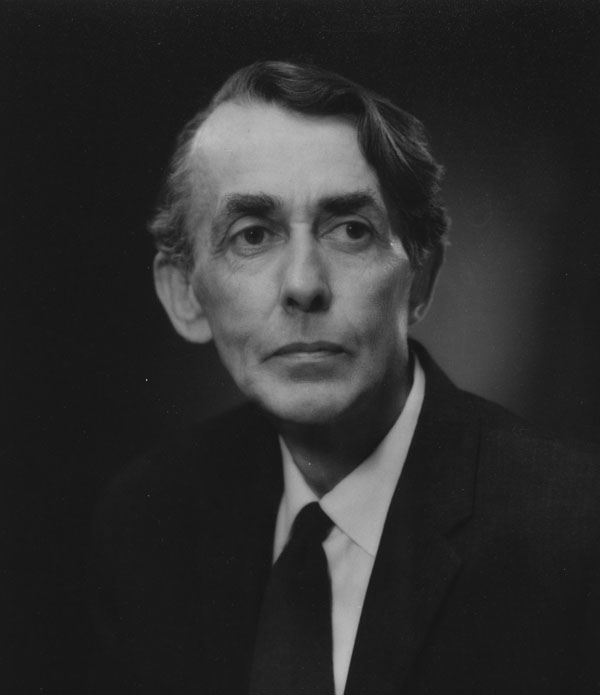
- Born: 16 October 1907
- Died: 6 April 1973 (aged 65)
- Spouse: Kathleen Caston Miller
- Scientific career
- Fields: Social policy, social work
- Workplaces: London School of Economics

Richard Morris Titmuss CBE FBA (16 October 1907 – 6 April 1973) was a British social researcher and teacher. He founded the academic discipline of social administration (now largely known in universities as social policy) and held the founding chair in the subject at the London School of Economics (LSE).

His books and articles of the 1950s helped to define the characteristics of Britain's post World War II welfare state and of a universal welfare society, in ways that parallel the contributions of Alva Myrdal and Gunnar Myrdal in Sweden. He is honoured in the Richard Titmuss Chair in Social Policy at the LSE, which is currently held by Julian Le Grand.

Titmuss's association with eugenics extended beyond the British Eugenics Society, to encompass other personal and intellectual connections.

He is also honoured by the annual Richard Titmuss Memorial Lecture in the Paul Baerwald School of Social Work at the Hebrew University of Jerusalem.

== Early life and the inaccuracy of the "Titmuss myth" ==
=== Established facts ===
Titmuss was born 16 October 1907 at Lane Farm, Stopsley, near (now a suburb of) Luton, Bedfordshire, the second child of farmer Morris Titmuss and Maud Louise (née Farr), also of farming background. Titmuss was brought up in the countryside and left St Gregory's preparatory school at 14 with no formal qualifications, having suffered from illness which curtailed his attendance. John Stewart, author of Richard Titmuss- A Commitment to Welfare (2020), observes that "although the school did seem to prioritise sport, its ambitions to send pupils on to public schools... suggests rather more academic rigour than is allowed in the usual accounts of the Titmuss myth".

=== The "Titmuss myth" ===
Stewart notes that general understanding of Titmuss's upbringing is shaped by an account of his life provided shortly after his death by Margaret Gowing, "a friend with whom he had worked during the Second World War"; it was from Gowing that the view of the Titmuss parents as "not up to much" derives- his mother "incompetent domestically", his father "failing as a farmer". Gowing herself heard of some of these matters from Titmuss's widow, Kathleen ("Kay"), who disliked her mother-in-law; Titmuss's daughter, Ann Oakley, wrote that Gowing's account was "weakened by its reliance on the singular perspective" of Titmuss's wife, she having sought to highlight "how important she had been to (Titmuss's) success, and how unimportant, indeed damaging" had been his upbringing, particularly by his mother. Per Stewart: "A particular version of Titmuss's life and work was put forward by Kay until the end of his life, and has had a shelf-life beyond. This was Kay ... the defender of the faith, defender of a man who had risen from poverty, formulated, with her background but essential assistance, new ways of thinking about social welfare... someone to be loved and admired". Stewart observes of Morris Titmuss's eventually curtailed farming endeavours and later similarly fraught efforts to operate a haulage business that this work took place amidst the financial upheavals following the First World War, and that all things considered "he was able to leave farming without leaving any debt behind, continued to pay his older son's school fees", and bought the terraced house at Hendon to which the family relocated.

Although Titmuss's entry in the Oxford Dictionary of National Biography reflects the above popularized account from Gowing, and calls his father an "unsuccessful small farmer", noting his wife to be of "rather less modest" farming background, Titmuss's upbringing "isolated and impecunious", Titmuss's daughter, Ann Oakley, undertook extensive research on her father's life, concluding the Titmuss family "wasn't all that impoverished": Morris Titmuss first leased Lane Farm from its owner, a widow, two years before his marriage to Maud, and subsequently leased 48 acres of adjacent land from a Major Clutterbuck. Lane Farm came to consist of 329 acres of arable and 34 of pastoral land, on which Morris Titmuss kept ten cows, eight other cattle, and six working horses, and employed five men and a boy in the business of selling milk and cultivating the land for the growth of animal feed. The farmhouse in which Richard Titmuss was raised contained "a drawing-room... dining-room... kitchen... scullery... pantry... four bedrooms and a boxroom"; the children were wet-nursed, as Oakley notes, "a fate that hardly befell babies in really poor families"; Richard's godmother was wife of the clergyman who had officiated Morris and Maud Titmuss's wedding, and who was "a prominent figure in the local Freemasons" and, with Morris Titmuss, active in the Stopsley Parish Council. Morris Titmuss's "middle-class, potentially income-draining, pursuits" included horse-racing; in 1908, his horse "Red Eagle" won the Hertfordshire Hunt Point-to-Point Steeplechase.

Eventually, having spent twenty years at Lane Farm, Morris Titmuss fell foul of a post-World War I government initiative to maximize cultivation of human food and provide smallholdings for ex-servicemen; the Bedfordshire War Agricultural Executive Committee decided to remove two fields (one sown with white clover, the other pasture)- totalling almost 33 acres- from Morris Titmuss's control, without which, he protested, his cows' milk-production could not continue at its present rate. He did however agree to relinquish ten acres. From this point onward conflict between Morris and the Bedfordshire County Council persisted, he questioning the validity of the council's claims over the land he farmed, and the Council questioning his competency as a farmer. A Council inspector issued a damning verdict of Lane Farm in 1917; despite the support of the widow from whom he leased the farm, the estate's trustees eventually agreed with the sale of the farm to the council for the availability of ex-servicemen. The Titmuss family relocated to a small terraced house at Hendon, where Morris Titmuss tried to turn around a "struggling haulage business", dying of heart problems in 1926.

Per Oakley, the seventeenth-century Titmuss (then "Tyttmuss") family were "well-off inhabitants" of Fairlands farm, "now a public park in Stevenage", with a predominant farming tradition from then on.

== Career ==
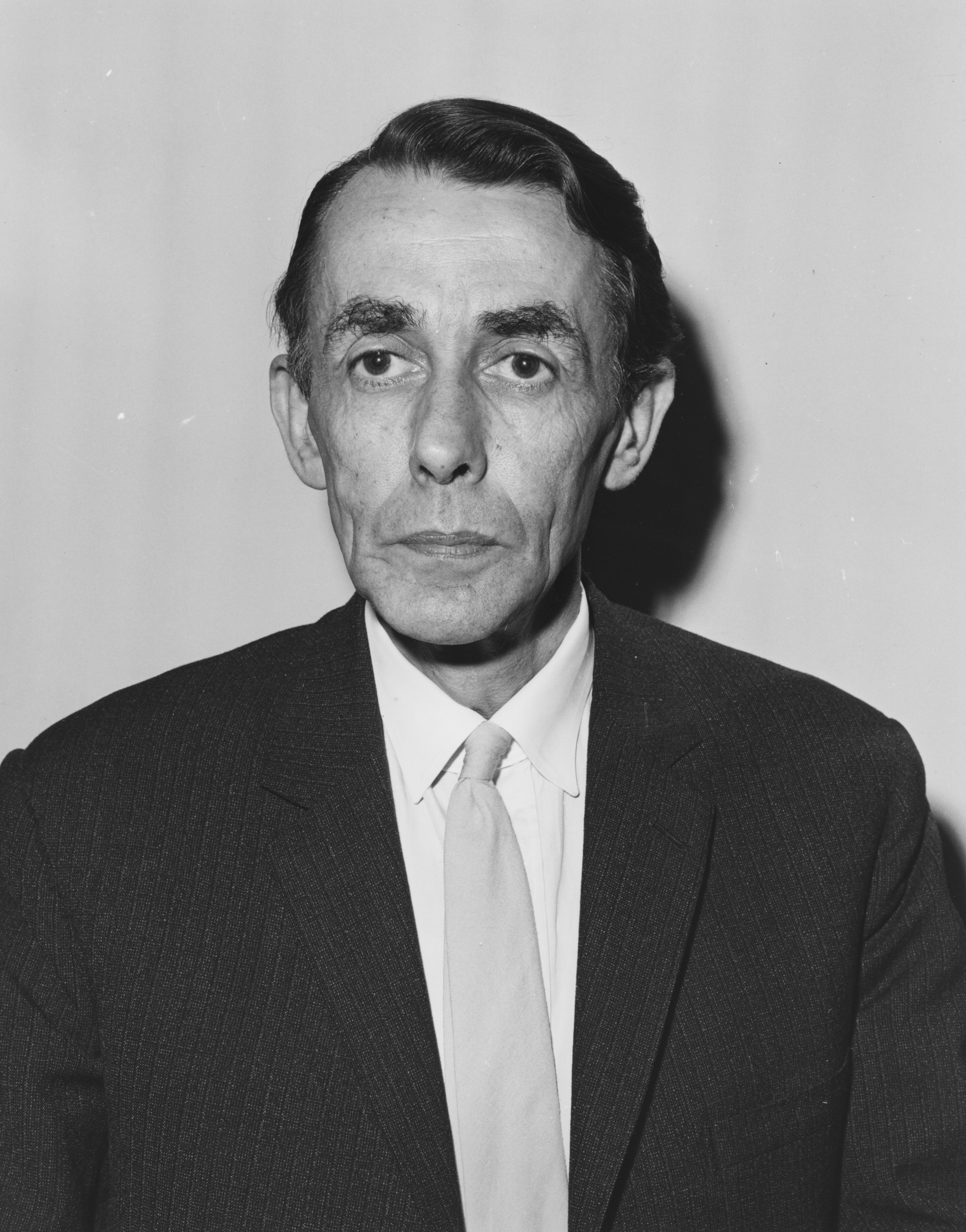
Titmuss, c. 1960s

An autodidact, he worked for a large insurance company as an actuary for 16 years whilst simultaneously pursuing an interest in social topics through reading, debating and writing. His initial concerns were with such issues as insurance and the age structure of the population, migration, unemployment and re-armament, foreign policy and the peace movement. In 1938 he published Poverty and Population, which focused on the regional differences between the North and South. In 1939, he published Our Food Problem. Around this time, Titmuss was also active in the British Eugenics Society.

In 1942, he was recruited to write a volume in the civil series of the official war history, the History of the Second World War. His Problems of Social Policy was published in 1950 which established his reputation as well as securing him the new chair at the London School of Economics. In this process, he was strongly supported by the sociologist T. H. Marshall.

At the LSE, where he was the first professor of Social Administration, he transformed the teaching of social work and social workers and established Social Policy as an academic discipline. He also contributed to a number of government committees on the health service and social policy. He also did some consulting in Africa, sometimes together with Professor Brian Abel-Smith, who was later his successor in his chair.

His concerns focused especially on issues of social justice. His final and perhaps the most important book, The Gift Relationship expressed his own philosophy of altruism in social and health policy and, like much of his work, emphasized his preference for the values of public service over private or commercial forms of care. The book was influential and resulted in a study of the blood bank systems, specifically with regard to regulation on the private blood market exchange. President Nixon called for a complete study of the lack of coordination within the system only months following publication of Titmuss' findings.

He has been criticized by Kenneth Arrow for a somewhat poor reading of some sociological classics (though he never claimed to be a sociologist), such as the works of Émile Durkheim; while this may partly reflect his somewhat inadequate academic training, it also derives from his impatience with non-participatory sociology and his preference (this became a defining characteristic of "his" discipline of 'social administration') for engagement with contemporary social policy issues and even some of its more fallible institutions. For example, he was much criticised for his role as a vice-chairman of the government's Supplementary Benefits Commission which some critics felt did not allow him enough distance. He, by contrast, argued in favour of trying to make inadequate institutions work better for the benefit of the poor even if his involvement with them had the potential to sully the purity of his reputation.

He held his chair from 1950, after brief spells in the Cabinet Office and the Social Medicine Research Unit, until his death in 1973.

== Influence ==
Some of his works are still read and some have been re-printed in newly edited forms exploring their contemporary relevance. Many of the writings for which he is known were actually delivered as lectures at the LSE or when he was a much sought-after public speaker. Although several of these were later assembled as 'readers' or 'essays', he never completed a summary of his work or philosophy nor wrote a single magnum opus on social policy. Consequently, there remains some confusion in secondary literature on his precise perspective on key issues, either of sociology or public policy.

The Richard Titmuss Professor of Social Policy was established after his death. Like Titmuss, its current holder, Professor Julian Le Grand has been a government adviser on health policy. However, his emphasis on the potential for the private or quasi markets within the NHS differs markedly from that of Titmuss who strongly believed in the state and universal services that were allocated exclusively on the basis of needs (instead of income or prestige).

Titmuss's critics include Frank Kemp Salter whose 2004 edited-book addresses and refines Titmuss's open-welfarism (universalist) position.

== Personal life ==
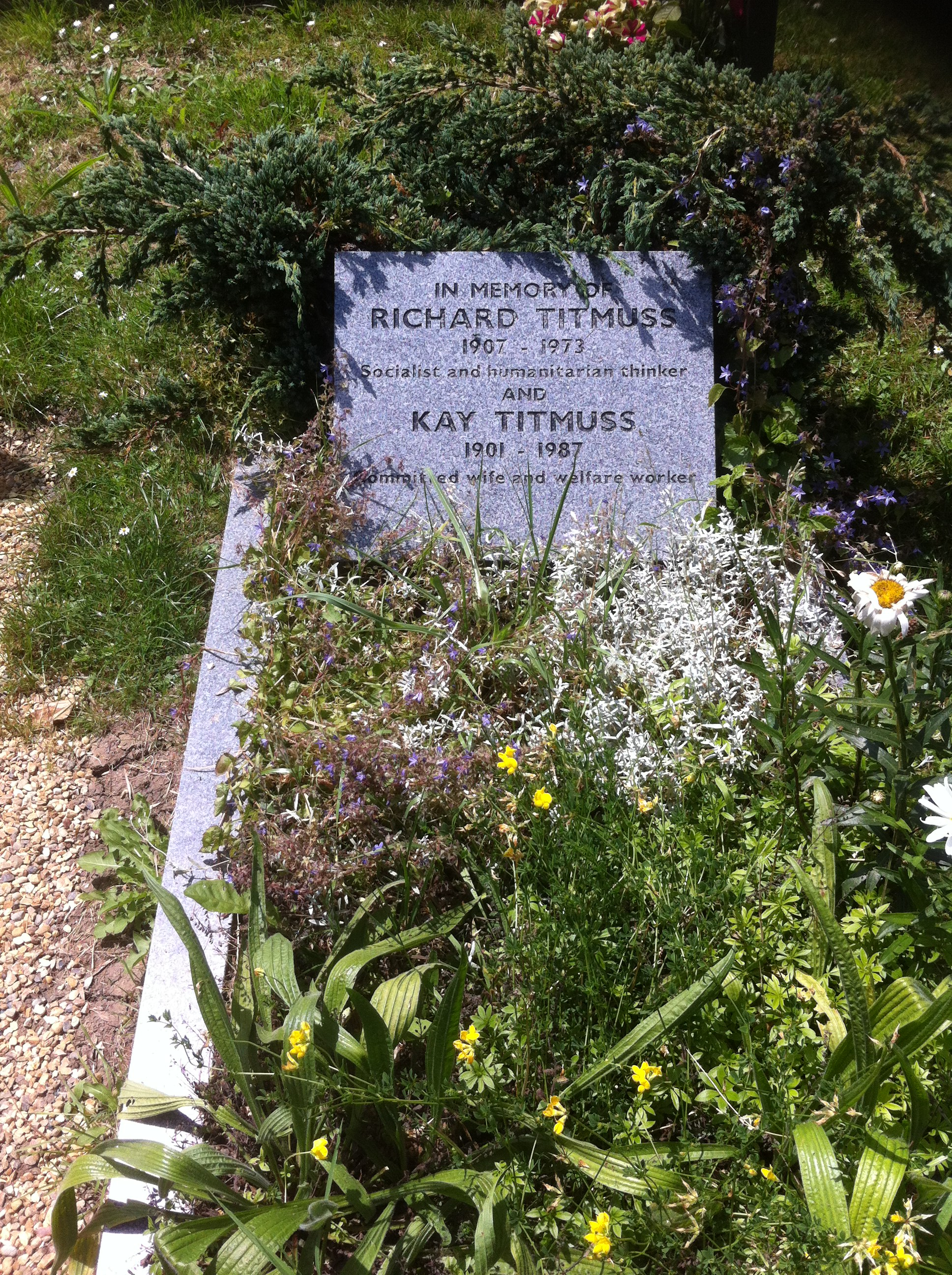
The memorial to Titmuss and his wife, Kay, in Highgate Cemetery.

He married Kathleen ("Kay") Miller, a social worker. Their only daughter, Ann Oakley, has edited some of his works for recent re-publication, and has written a biography of her parents, Man and Wife: Richard and Kay Titmuss: My Parents' Early Years. In this she chronicles the important role Kay played in supporting his early work, and in co-authoring their book Parents' Revolt (1942), which focused on the decline of the birth rate. Oakley has, however, also been critical of the role played by her mother in creating and promulgating the "Titmuss myth" of her father's poverty-stricken origins, stating that this was designed to elevate Titmuss as a "champion of equality and the welfare state transcending his own impoverished background through sheer hard work, a truly self-made man", and that Kay Titmuss sought to emphasise "how important she had been to (Titmuss's) success" in contrast to his parents.

Titmuss was an agnostic.

A heavy smoker, Titmuss died from lung cancer.

== Major works ==
His major works include:

- Problems of Social Policy, R. M. Titmuss, 1950
- Essays on the Welfare State, R. M. Titmuss, 1958
- Income Distribution and Social Change, R. M. Titmuss, 1962
- Commitment to Welfare, 1968
- Titmuss, Richard, The Gift Relationship: From Human Blood to Social Policy (1970). Reprinted by the New Press, ISBN 1-56584-403-3 (reissued with new chapters 1997, John Ashton & Ann Oakley, LSE Books)
- Titmuss, Richard, Social Policy. An Introduction. Edited by Brian Abel-Smith and Kay Titmuss.George Allen & Unwin (Publishers) Ltd. London. 1974.

See also recently edited collections of his lectures and articles:

- Titmuss, Richard (2001). Oakley, Ann; Alcock, Peter; Glennerster, Howard; Sinfield, Adrian (eds.). Welfare and wellbeing: Richard Titmuss's contribution to social policy. Bristol (England): Policy Press. ISBN 9781861342997. OCLC 5104775528.
- Titmuss, Richard (2004). Oakley, Ann; Barker, Jonathan (eds.). Private complaints and public health: Richard Titmuss on the National Health Service. Bristol (England): Policy Press. ISBN 9781861345608. OCLC 538212726.

== See also ==
- Social policy
