= Whitehall Study =

Health study of British civil servants

The Whitehall Studies investigated social determinants of health, specifically the cardiovascular disease prevalence and mortality rates among British civil servants. The initial prospective cohort study, the Whitehall I Study, examined over 17,500 male civil servants between the ages of 20 and 64, and was conducted over a period of ten years, beginning in 1967. A second cohort study, the Whitehall II Study, was conducted from 1985 to 1988 and examined the health of 10,308 civil servants aged 35 to 55, of whom two thirds were men and one third women. A long-term follow-up of study subjects from the first two phases is ongoing.

The studies, named after the Whitehall area of London and originally led by Michael Marmot, found a strong association between grade levels of civil servant employment and mortality rates from a range of causes: the lower the grade, the higher the mortality rate. Men in the lowest grade (messengers, doorkeepers, etc.) had a mortality rate three times higher than that of men in the highest grade (administrators). This effect has since been observed in other studies and named the "status syndrome".

== Whitehall I ==
The first Whitehall Study compared mortality of people in the highly stratified environment of the British Civil Service. It showed that among British civil servants, mortality was higher among those in the lower grade when compared to the higher grade. The more senior one was in the employment hierarchy, the longer one might expect to live compared to people in lower employment grades.

The first of the Whitehall studies, or Whitehall I, found higher mortality rates due to all causes for men of lower employment grade. The study also revealed a higher mortality rate specifically due to coronary heart disease for men in the lower employment grade when compared to men in higher grades.

The initial Whitehall study found lower grades, and thus status, were clearly associated with higher prevalence of significant risk factors. These risk factors include obesity, smoking, reduced leisure time, lower levels of physical activity, higher prevalence of underlying illness, higher blood pressure, and shorter height. Controlling for these risk factors accounted for no more than forty percent of differences between civil service grades in cardiovascular disease mortality. After controlling for these risk factors, the lowest grade still had a relative risk of 2.1 for cardiovascular disease mortality compared to the highest grade.

Whitehall I was carried out by the Department of Medical Statistics & Epidemiology at the London School of Hygiene & Tropical Medicine and published in 1987. The Whitehall Study papers are available to view at the School's archives.

== Whitehall II ==
Twenty years later, the Whitehall II study documented a similar gradient in morbidity in women as well as men. The name Whitehall II was derived from the previous Whitehall study. The Whitehall Studies revealed this social gradient for a range of different diseases: heart disease, some cancers, chronic lung disease, gastrointestinal disease, depression, suicide, sickness absence, back pain and general feelings of ill-health. A major challenge, and a reason for the importance of these studies, was to understand the causes of this social distribution of so many disorders.

Whitehall II is a longitudinal, prospective cohort study of 10,308 women and men, all of whom were employed in the London offices of the British Civil Service at the time they were recruited to the study in 1985. The Study is led by Professor Mika Kivimaki at University College London. The initial data collection included a clinical examination and self-report questionnaire. Since then, thirteen waves of data collection have been completed: phase 1 (1984-1985; age 35 to 55), phase 2 (1989-1990), phase 3 (1991-1993), phase 4 (1995-1996), phase 5 (1997-1999), phase 6 (2001), phase 7 (2002-2004), phase 8 (2006), phase 9 (2007-2009), phase 10 (2011), phase 11 (2012-2013), phase 12 (2015-2016), phase 13 (2019-2022). The thirteenth wave began in February 2019 and finished in January 2023. It took longer as usual due to the Covid-19 pandemic.

Phase	Dates	Age	Participation	Response rate (alive)	Response rate (eligible*)
1	1985-1988	35 to 55	10,308	-reference-	-reference-
2	1989-1990	37 to 60	8,132	79.3%	79.3%
3	1991-1994	39 to 64	8,815	86.6%	86.6%
4	1995-1996	42 to 65	8,628	86.6%	92.4%
5	1997-1999	45 to 69	7,870	78.7%	86.3%
6	2001	48 to 71	7,355	74.4%	82.5%
7	2002-2004	50 to 74	6,967	71.6%	82.2%
8	2006	53 to 76	7,173	75.2%	87.2%
9	2007-2009	55 to 80	6,761	72.3%	84.5%
10 (**)	2011	57 to 82	277	n/a	n/a
11	2012-2013	58 to 83	6,318	70.9%	84.1%
12	2015-2016	61 to 86	5,632	66.6%	80.2%
13	2019-2023	64 to 89	4,307	56.4%	70.6%

More information about this table at the Data Collection (external link) page of the project.

Research continues to explore the pathways and mechanisms through which social position influences health. The research group aims to build a causal model leading from social position through psychosocial and behavioural pathways to pathophysiological changes, sub-clinical markers of disease, functional change, and clinical disease.

The Whitehall II study began as a study of working age people and investigated the relationships between work, stress, and health. Whitehall II found that the way work is organised, the work climate, social influences outside work, influences from early life, and health behaviours all contribute to the social gradient in health. As participants in this study continue through adult life, the research focuses on inequalities in health and functioning in an aging population. With an increasingly large population of older citizens in the UK, there is an urgent need to identify the causes of social inequalities and to study the long-term effects of previous circumstances on people's ability to function and stay healthy during retirement. Researchers in the Whitehall II team are also considering the role of social inequalities in relation to dementia risk.

== Data sharing ==
The Whitehall II team have a data sharing policy, allowing researchers from other institutions to use data from the Whitehall II cohort. There is a slightly different data sharing policy for projects that involve genetic information. This policy suggests that the team are engaging with the open access movement, a social movement which is gaining momentum in academia.

== International impact ==
The social gradient in health is not a phenomenon confined to the British Civil Service. Throughout the developed world, wherever researchers have had data to investigate, they have observed the social gradient in health. In order to address inequalities in health, it is necessary both to understand how social organisation affects health, and to find ways to improve the conditions in which people work and live.

Michael Marmot chaired the World Health Organization's Commission on Social Determinants of Health (CSDH), which was established in 2005 and launched its final report in August 2008. The Commission sought to engage with policy makers, global institutions, and civil society on the issues around health inequalities within and between countries, the social determinants of health, and act to address those issues. The CSDH acted as a catalyst for change, working with countries, academics, and civil society to bring health inequalities to the fore in the national policy dialogue. The overarching goals of the CSDH were to improve population health, to reduce health inequities, and to reduce disadvantages due to ill health.

== Explanations and implications ==
Subjects of Whitehall II in the lowest employment grades were more likely to have many of the established risk factors of coronary heart disease (CHD): a propensity to smoke, lower height-to-weight ratio, less leisure time, and higher blood pressure. However, even after normalizing for those factors, the lower employment grades were still at greater risk for a heart attack; another factor was at work.

Some have pointed to cortisol, a hormone produced by the body as a response to stress. An effect of cortisol release is a reduction in the immune system's efficacy through lymphocyte manipulation. One theory explaining the connection between immune-efficiency and CHD is that infectious pathogens, such as herpes or Chlamydia, are at least partially responsible for coronary diseases. Therefore, a body with a chronically suppressed immune system will be less able to prevent CHD.

A study of the cortisol awakening response (the difference between cortisol levels upon awakening and thirty minutes later) further supports the significance of cortisol. Workers showed no significant difference in cortisol levels upon awakening, regardless of socioeconomic position. However, the lower employment grades showed significantly higher levels thirty minutes later, particularly if it was a workday. Researchers concluded that to be caused by chronic stress and its anticipation.

This seems counter-intuitive: one usually thinks of those with the most decision-making responsibility as the ones with the most stressful lives. One theory is that the lower one is on the chain of command, the less control one has over his or her life. Not having to take orders on how to perform a task, or when to do it, results in lower heart rate, stress hormones, and blood pressure than being told how and when to perform it.

This theory, however, is not without its detractors. A Finnish study conducted a cohort study similar to Whitehall, but with greater analysis of the worker's stress. The study determined that decision autonomy was not a significant contributing factor to coronary heart disease, but that lack of predictability in the workplace was a significant factor. In the Finnish study, "predictability" was defined as high stability of work and lack of unexpected changes, and was found to correlate closely to employment grade.

Others argue that because there is a strong correlation between low employment grade and domestic stress, stress from a lack of control at work cannot be the whole story. In this line of reasoning, the size of one's paycheck alone could significantly contribute to overall stress. Those with fewer resources have a harder time making ends meet, a situation that can be a tremendous source of chronic anxiety.

Adding to the controversy is the disagreement over the cortisol explanation in the first place. The theory is based on a pathogenic contribution to coronary heart disease and the stressed body's inability to fight it. Follow-up studies on the Whitehall II cohort failed to demonstrate a correlation between pathogen burden and socioeconomic status, whereas other studies in different parts of the world have.

An alternative to the cortisol explanation is that self-esteem is the major contributing factor and that the link between professional achievement and self-esteem accounts for the health gradient. The study supporting this view correlated low self-esteem in test subjects with greater reductions in heart rate variability and higher heart rates in general—both established coronary heart disease risk factors—while performing stressful tasks.

Currently there is no universally-accepted cause for the phenomenon brought to light by the Whitehall studies. Clearly, stress is associated with a higher risk of coronary heart disease, but so are many other non-traditional factors. Furthermore, "stress" seems to be too nonspecific. There are different kinds of stress in one's day-to-day life and each kind could contribute differently. Vaananen, et al., are making great headway in this regard by researching which components of stress are responsible and which are not.

Regardless of the exact reason why coronary heart disease is more prevalent in lower employment grades, the results of the Whitehall studies have significantly changed the way some doctors approach the evaluation of heart disease risk. By recognizing the effects of psychosocial stressors on the body, in addition to the traditional risk factors, physicians can offer a better assessment of a patient's health.

== Direction ==
Professor Sir Michael Marmot of the Department of Epidemiology and Public Health at University College London initiated the Whitehall II study. It is now directed by Professor Mika Kivimaki. Marmot was the commissioner of the World Health Organization's Commission on Social Determinants of Health.

== See also ==
- Robert Sapolsky Research on Stress
- Weathering hypothesis
