= Mark Crosweller =

Australian public servant

Mark Crosweller has served as head of Australia's National Resilience Taskforce, part of the Department of Home Affairs, having been appointed there following his service as the Director-General of Emergency Management Australia. He previously served as the third Commissioner for the ACT Emergency Services Agency responsible for the ACT Fire Brigade, ACT Ambulance Service, Rural Fire Service and State Emergency Service. He was appointed to this position in 2009 and left in 2012 for the Emergency Management Australia role. Crosweller had earlier been an Assistant Commissioner in the New South Wales Rural Fire Service.

He is a Fellow of the Australian Institute of Management.

== Honours ==
- 1999 – NSW RFS Commissioner's Commendation
- 2000 – National Medal
- 2003 – Australian Fire Service Medal

== See also ==
- Australian Capital Territory Emergency Services Agency
