= Bushfires in the Australian Capital Territory =

Natural disasters

The Australian Capital Territory (ACT) has a long history of bushfires. Typically, the fire season commences on 1 October and runs through until 31 March the following year. During this time the ACT will commonly experience wildfires including grassfires and bushfires. Most years will have a few fires of varying sizes and impacts, but some seasons are more significant than others.

== History of Bushfires in the ACT ==
=== The Limestone Plains (1800s - 1911) ===
There are very few records regarding bushfires in the Australian Capital Territory (known at the time as Limestone Plains) from the early 1800s to the first quarter of the twentieth century. There are records of fires in the surrounding areas of modern-day Queanbeyan, Sutton, Gunning, New South Wales Wee Jasper and Goulburn as early as 1833.

In January 1862 it was reported in the Queanbeyan Age and General Advertiser that large bush fires had raged around Queanbeyan. It is also reported in the Queanbeyan Age that during January 1875 bush fires occurred in all parts of Australia, and this report specifically included the Limestone Plains.

==== 1888 ====
A fire impacts the Sutton, Queanbeyan and Bungondore areas.

==== 1902 ====
A fire burns between the Murrumbidgee River and Weetangera.

==== 1904 ====
In December 1904 there were widespread fires across NSW. One in particular burnt large tracts of what is today the ACT.

This fire crossed the Murrumbidgee River about noon Sunday, 1st January at a spot known as Horseshoe Bend, and was stopped the same day behind Gungahlin Homestead. This fire travelled through Kilby's at the falls, the southern edge of the fire entering the Territory somewhere near where Mr. Shepard now resides, and travelled in an easterly direction. Heavy losses of fencing and stock resulted, buildings destroyed including outbuildings and Kilby's homestead, the old store at Ginninderra and odd buildings at Ginninderra Station.

==== 1906 ====
January 1906 saw a bushfire in the Naas area, to the south of the Territory. This fire included a reported entrapment of a number of firefighters.

==== 1909 ====
Multiple fires around both Hall and Bungendore. During this period, a nearby weather station at Queanbeyan recorded the highest maximum and minimum temperature on record at the time - 105.5°F (40.8°C) maximum and 69.8°F (21°C) minimum.

==== 1910 ====
The Queanbeyan Age from Tuesday 18 January 1910 reports

"The Weetangara Fire Brigade burnt several firebreaks around the various holdings before Christmas. Mr. Crace kindly lent his fire-fighter for the purpose."

=== Federal Capital Territory (1911-1938) ===
The Federal Capital Territory (FCT) was transferred to the Commonwealth by New South Wales on 1 January 1911, two years before the naming of Canberra as the national capital on 20 March 1913.

==== 1913 ====
Fire in Tidbinbilla area, burning right through to Murrays Gap.

Bush fire west of the Murrumbidgee River, Parish Congwarra 23/12/1913

Sir,

In accordance with your verbal instructions of the 16th and on the above Subject I at once proceeded to the locality and beg to report as follows:-

The fire had a spread over a very large area, the face of which was approx. 10 miles long, the southern part where the greatest danger threatened, extended from Paddy's River near the south boundary of Phillip Hardy's land (now Commonwealth property) for about 4 miles west, and had already got into the unimproved country owned by Halcliffe and was dangerously near Tuggeranong which at present is heavily grassed and dry as tinder.

On my arrival I found the local Settlers and Station hands had done splendid work and had the fire checked inside Halcliffe's boundary but about 1½ mile at Paddy's River end was burning fiercely and appeared to be beaten the fighters and was unattended. After reviewing the situation I proceeded to the Cotter works & Mr Alfords representing Mr. Brilliant at once placed men and gear at my disposal and within 2½ hours 20 men were at the fire 4 miles away, with the necessary tools etc. Starting one gang on Paddy's River end of the southern front to make a trail to meet the fire by raking up leaves etc. I took another gang over the mountain (by this time very dark), and commenced a trail from where the men had the fire checked at Mr. Halcliffe's land, and after working hard all night the two gangs met at daylight with a completed trail.

These men were replaced on the 17th by 20 men, 10 of which under a ganger were sent to assist the tired workers at Halcliffe's and further west; the balance commenced the work of trailing the eastern wing of the fire. At sundown these men were replaced by 6 men under a ganger who watched the break on the southern front until daylight.

On the 18th had 35 men in 4 gangs, 3 of which worked on the trail from Paddy's River along the eastern & northern wing to near Hardy's Mountain on Pierces Creek, where an old fire had died out some weeks previously: this trail had the effect of preventing the fire extending north and east, and so saving Holding 83 (Wm. Hardy) & Moore's holding and the greater part of Phil Hardy Jnr. (the whole now Commonwealth property) and at the same time preventing the possibility of the fire reaching the Murrumbidgee and so spreading to “Tuggeranong” by this route.

On the night of the 18th 6 men i/c of a ganger watched the fire and on the 19th from early morning I rode the trail with one man and attended to dangerous places; this man (Mr. Flint) I left to patrol the fire whilst there is likely to be danger & to phone from the Cotter at once should the fire jump over trail & be beyond his control.

The damage done was slight, and consisted to the dog proof fence on the southern boundary of Phil Hardy's holdings; as the fire was still burning an estimate of the number of posts burned cannot be until later. However it is safe to say that had the men not been available and action delayed 24 hours, the fire would have been in the grass country, through Hardy's Holdings & on to Tuggeranong and it is likely the whole country side would have been burned. There are still hundreds of acres of timber burning, but with ordinary care, it is not likely that there will be any further trouble, for the trails were carefully & of fair width.

I wish to point out that Mr. Alfords as Mr. Brilliants representative placed men and materials at my disposal with great promptness, and had the men conveyed to and from the fire without a hitch, and further assisted me in every possible way; the men and their part, from gangers down worked splendidly, at night as well as during the day.

Yours faithfully J C Brackenreg Inspector, Lands & Survey Canberra

==== 1918 ====
A fire moved from the west near Mount Coree toward Mount Stromlo.

This fire travelled from the direction of Coree and was driven in a narrow more or less confined space over Bullen, bark and rubbish being driven by the wind on this side of the river, with the result that Stromlo was endangered, but owing to the narrowness of the fire and the scarcity of feed, its progress was held up at Bulga creek near J. Brown's residence.

==== 1920 ====
Fire near Tidbinbilla, moving up toward Orroral Valley. This fire followed a similar path to the Orroral Valley fire in 2020.

This fire came out of the Cotter over Tidbinbilla Mountain and was driven by the prevailing wind in a South-easterly direction. The fire travelled from Staunton's at Tidbinbilla over Mount Domain into Gibralter Creek and up Gibralter Creek to the head of Kangaroo Flat and from there to Orroral via Mt. Tennent. Over 200 men were engaged on this fire, many being supplied by this Administration. Considerable damage was done to the bush country, but fortunately the fire was kept out of the improved land, so that losses in this respect were not heavy.

==== 1927 ====
A fire threatened the Mount Stromlo Pine plantation.

==== 1929 ====
A fire came from the direction of Wee Jasper toward the FCT.

==== 1931 ====
On 31 December 1931 from another fire which began near Wee Jasper.

This fire travelled from the direction of Wee Jasper to Horseshoe Bend and was stopped at great expense to this Administration at the Murrumbidgee River by a line drawn from the River in a westerly direction. This fire occurred on New Year's Day, and had the high wind been blowing on that occasion, nothing would have kept it on the other side of the river, and as the country was heavily grassed and the fire reached the Murrumbidgee early in the morning, there is no doubt that the position for would have been even more serious that was the case in the recent fire.

B.J Bond, the Forest Foreman wrote the following report;

Acting under your instructions on the 31st December, 1931, I took four men in my car to fire on the Horseshoe Estate, in New South Wales territory, arriving at the fire at 4pm. Mr. M. Walker was controlling operations and had about 15 men on the western front at this time. I handed my four men over to him and they were at once put to work beating out. Mr. Walker and I then rode to the southern front.

There were no men on this section, and from this point there was the greatest danger of the fire spreading into the F.C.T. I advised getting ten men to work immediately on this front in order to carry the fire along a small creek running into the Murrumbidgee River, thus stopping the spread in a southerly directions. Mr. Walker agreed to this plan and rode back to call up the men, when a message came for him reporting a fresh outbreak of fire at the Mullion, near his home.

Mr. Walker left for the new outbreak, taking twelve of his men with him, leaving me with four of my men and three others. We fought the fire towards the river until a strong east wind carried it out of control. Mr. Walker returned at this time with his men having found that the report of fire at Mullion was a false alarm. He took charge and held the fire on a dry creek running parallel with the western front, and this creek in connection with a gully running to the river was the means by which the outbreak was got under control.

All burning grass on all fronts was under control by 3.30am on 1 January 1932. Throwing in and raking back the burning logs and debris was carried on by all available men, and some straightening up of the front was done by burning out dangerous angles.

I had received reinforcements of 16 men from Canberra, 6 arriving at 7pm on the 31 December 1931 and 10 at 6am on 1 January 1932, with 3 from Uriarra who arrived at 12 midnight on 31/12/31. Seven men were released at 8.30am on 1 January 1932 from the western front and sent back to Canberra.

At 2pm on 1/1/32 I considered it safe to withdraw the remainder of the Canberra men (14) leaving the southern front, which was the most dangerous salient, to be guarded by the local men and ten men from Hall side. Three Uriarra men were left to guard a small dangerous salient on the west front.

On 2nd January, 1932 I inspected the fire and found all quiet, there being only two salient where careful guard and felling of Stringybark trees was necessary. This work was being carried out by Canberra men and locals.

I estimate the area burned at 2,500 to 3,000 acres. No stock were burnt. A large number of men were on patrol on the east side of the river on 31st December, 1931 and I feel sure that the fire could have been put under control by 12 noon on 31st December, 1931 if half of those men had crossed to the western side on the morning of the 31st December.

(SGD.) B. J. Bond Forest Foreman

==== 1932 ====
A fire burnt in the Cotter Valley through January and February.

MEMORANDUM for: The Chief Lands Officer. Cotter Valley Fire. January–February, 1932.

As a result of a conference held at the residence of the Chief Lands Officer on Saturday afternoon, 30th January, it was decided to send men to the fire to attempt to arrest its progress and prevent it crossing the Cotter River.

On Sunday, 31st January, Franklin and party approached the north end of the fire from the Brindabella Road and the Reid-Flint party approached the eastern side from Tidbinbilla. The two parties met at Top Flats which served as their base camp. As the result of a few points of rain on Saturday night, the fire was dull on Sunday, and the Franklin party, on its way down to the River, rounded up the isolated portions which were burning and decided to run a trail from the Cotter River to the fire at its nearest point.

This trail was commenced on Monday, 1st February, south of Bushrangers’ Creek, but during the day the fire livened up and broke away, and the trail had to be abandoned in favour of a new line north of Bushrangers’ Creek. Flint and Franklin worked together for a day or two on this new line from the Cotter up the very steep hill along Hardy's old fence line, and Franklin then transferred his camp from Top Flats to the Tea Tree Yards near the territorial boundary, and began trailing down from the top to meet Flint.

By Thursday morning, the 4th February, a half mile of this trail was still uncompleted, but in view of the approach of the fire to the river, it was decided to light the trail. On Thursday night and Friday morning, Reid lit along the Cotter River from Bull Creek to Bushrangers’ Creek, Flint from Bushrangers’ Creek to half way to the top of the Mountain, and Franklin from that point to the top. The back firing seems to have been well done, and jumped the trail in only one place, when it crossed the river at Top Flats, but it was checked just before reaching camp there. The trail was well-made from the river halfway up the mountain by the combined Flint-Franklin party, but the top half of the trail was rather poorly done, and it seems to me rather more by good luck than good management that the fire was held. It looks as though Franklin was obliged to light his trail before it was completed right through, and took a chance on a section of it, and raked in as he lit up.

On Friday afternoon, 5th February, rain came, checking the fire, and on Saturday, 6th February, all men were withdrawn from the fire.

On Friday morning, 5th instant, a fire at the head of Bourke's Creek was observed by Overseer Bradley from Uriarra Forest. This did not increase very much during the day and on Saturday, 6th, Reid and Flint inspected it and found that it had burned about 30 acres at the foot of St. John's Rock. The origin of this fire is unknown. I consider it impossible that it could have started from the big fire- more than a mile away- in view of the conditions prevailing, and owing to its inaccessibility and the sparseness of grass, it seems hardly likely that it was maliciously lit. Lightning which is reported by Flint to have occurred on the previous evening may have been responsible for it.

On Saturday and Sunday, 13th and 14th February, an inspection of the fire was made from Bull Creek to the territorial boundary near Bull's Head, and only one log was found burning, and this was out before the fire was left on the 15th instant.

There were no accidents at the fire, but some of the horses strayed from the camp and have not yet been recovered. When it appeared probable at one stage that the fire would cross the Cotter, arrangements were made to rake the trail used in 1926, and this was done from the Tidbinbilla Sawmill southwards by Snow and volunteers; from the Sawmill northwards to Kirschener's Gate by Maloney and volunteers; and from Kirschener's Gate to the Brindabella Road, via Vanity's Crossing by Forestry employees.

C.R.Cole Forester

==== 1926 ====
January 1926 is the first recorded significant bushfire.

This fire, in all its aspects, except that the weather was more favourable, resembled the recent fire, came from the same direction and the front was almost as extensive. Fortunately, however, owing to the more favourable weather, we were able to meet it in the forest and a trail of perhaps 40 miles length was made by employees of this Administration, and local landholders, which confined the fire to a great extent to the unimproved country. Had the high winds been blowing on that occasion, as we experienced at this latest fire, the result would have been the same. In fact the damage on that occasion would possibly have been greater, owing to the heavy growth of feed which was present on the occasion.

===== JC Brackenreg Report =====
MEMORADUM for - The COMMISSIONER. BUSH FIRES.

I returned from Recreation Leave on Saturday, the 30th January, and found that a bush fire had been raging since the previous Wednesday (27th). This was a local fire started, it was understood, by some person boiling a billy can at Condor Creek. I immediately visited the localities and found the front of the fire had been stopped and was being watched. Part of the northern, the whole of the western and part of the southern fronts were burning back into the mountain.

Immediate action was taken on the Sunday to trail the southern, northern and western fronts with the result that on the following Thursday night this fire was surrounded, but many parts of the trail were extremely dangerous.

On the 3rd February, in the forenoon, a report reached me that a mountain fire had crossed at Tidbinbilla on a face from the Fisherman's gap to Tidbinbilla Peak, a distance of a couple of miles. A trustworthy bushman who was sent out to make a reconnaissance from the top of the mountain, reported the fire was travelling on the face from the top of Tidbinbilla where it crossed on the northern end, north-easterly toward Coree and on the southern end, south-easterly towards Orroral.

With that information in hand it became apparent, with the prevailing weather, that the fire must be trailed from Orroral (where I learnt earlier in the day there was some burnt country) to connect with the southern front of the local fire referred to above.

The trail was cut into three sections, one section from Billy Billy Rocks to Orraral and was managed by Booroomba and Cuppacumbalong Stations assisted by six Commission men (who were fed by the Stations referred to). From Billy Billy Rocks over the head of Tidbinbilla and from there south to Oakey Creek a trail was bought along by free holders and leaseholders assisted by about twenty-five Commission employees, under a man selected by the landholders and myself. These numbers were augmented by another forty-five men on one occasion when the fire got over the trail. From Oakey Creek across the Cotter to what is known as Vanity's Crossing to the southern front of the fire already referred to, Commission employees alone made and held this trail.

About the 8th February, Milson of Uriarra telephoned to say another fire was coming in over Coree and was approaching the Territory to the north of the held fires. I told him that we had our hands full holding the trail from Orroral to Uriarra, and that I considered that it was the duty of the freeholders to run a trail out to head this fire off and that I would let him have four bushmen as they could be spared from the other fire. I also got in touch with the whole of the lessees to the north of Canberra, who would be affected by this fire, and asked them to go out. Many of them did go out and put in good work, but many of them didn't go and would not send out men.

On Friday Milson phoned to say that the fire had beaten him. Twenty Commission employees were dispatched the next morning, with food, in charge a competent man who was to work in conjunction with Mr. Milson. A new trail was made with the assistance of a few lessees and local landholders to a point on Swamp Creek, outside the Territory, at which time it became known that a fire was raging from the Goodradigbee River and travelling east and north-east.

The fire was being fought by a number of residents in that locality and volunteers from other parts. Between Tuesday and Saturday of that week it was toss up as to whether the men from Yass and our men would hold the fire. Many trails were made and many times the trail was broken until at last on Friday the men fell back as far as possible in the bush country, fortunately the wind lulled, and they were able to connect the two trails up and which were subsequently held.

J. Brackenreg, Lands Officer, 4 May 1926

==== 1938-39 ====
November 1938 to mid-January 1939 were the driest months on record since 1918, with practically no rain in the Territory since November, with a heat wave beginning about 3 January and lasting until 14 January. There were ultimately three fires that impacted the FCT on 13 January - one near Mount Franklin in the south, Mount Coree in the west and Horseshoe Bend in the North. By early morning Saturday 14 January, strong winds gusting up to 70 kilometers per hour started numerous spot fires in the region, with reported maximum spotting distance was 24 kilometers. By Saturday afternoon the fires had raged over a total front of 45 miles along the Murrumbidgee River, and had crossed it at several places.

===== Mount Coree Fire =====
A fire started in the hills about 40 miles directly behind Uriarra Station (beyond the Goodradigbee River) and had been burning in NSW since Tuesday.

The Two Sticks Road fire burnt across the Uriarra Pine Plantation, completely destroying it, and was halted along the Murrumbidgee River. Around noon on Saturday a burning ember from the Uriarra Fire started a spot fire at Huntley (about 6 miles away), this fire swept towards Mt Stromlo but was quickly halted about 2 miles away from Mount Stromlo.

===== Horseshoe Bend Fire =====
The Horseshoe Bend fire spotted across the Murrumbidgee River at the Kurrajong Waterhole. The fire was confined to the north side of the Hall-Kurrajong Road, it then passed through 'Glenwood' Station, and spread into sparsely timbered country on a 5-mile front. It was halted north of Hall.

===== Mount Franklin Fire =====
The Mount Franklin fire burnt right across the Territory. There were serious outbreaks at Tidbinbilla, Cuppacumbalong, Booroomba and Lanyon. Later as it entered New South Wales there were outbreaks around Royalla. A cool change accompanied by rain moved across the Canberra region on Sunday 15 January, extinguishing most fire fronts.

Fortunately there were no deaths, and stock losses were comparatively small, the main losses were to property. 150,000 acres of timbered and grazing land burnt out (including 1100 hectares of pine plantation worth 300,000 pounds) and nearly 40 miles of fencing, particularly in the Tidbinbilla and Uriarra area, were destroyed. These fires covered and estimated 60,000 hectares of forest and grazing land, including 1,100 hectares of pine plantation.

=== Post-War Years (1950-2000) ===
In 1951–52, several severe bushfires came close to the urban areas of Canberra under the influence of strong westerly winds. Two people died and there was extensive damage to grazing properties across the 13,000 hectares burnt. The Stromlo pine plantation and observatory grounds were also burnt. Total fire bans were imposed from 26 to 28 January and from 1 February to 2 March 1952, inclusively.

==== 1952 ====
There were five major fires during the first months of 1952.

===== Bobbys Plain Fire =====
Started 17 January on the Brindabella-Tumut Road, burning approximately 2,000 acres.

===== Tanner Fire =====
Started around 23 January on Block 26A, Woden. Attributed to a magpie landing on a powerline, it burnt 500 acres, and contributed to the Powerline Fires in the next few days.

===== Powerline Fires =====
Multiple ignitions were reported starting at 1015 on 25 January. The first was called the Campbell Fire, started in Yarralumla. The second started at about 1100, near Red Hill and was named the Jennings Fire. Strong westerly winds pushed the Jennings Fire over the summit of Red Hill, and caused the Tanner Fire to flare up and break containment. The three fires then converged, before burning over Mugga Hill and down toward Tuggeranong. Its spread was stopped at around 1800 that day, but the fire continued to burn until at least 27 January. The Powerline fire is attributed with the death of two firefighters, the loss of at least two houses and several more outbuildings.

===== Mount Stromlo Fire =====
The Mount Stromlo Fire started just before 1100 on Walker Hill, north west of Mount Stromlo, by a lightning strike. A strong westerly wind at 70kph (44 mph) fanned the flames toward the Observatory at the summit of Mount Stromlo. The fire impacted the Observatory, resulting in an explosion in the Machine Shop wing due to an Oxygen Cylinder, and continued over the Cotter Road and into Kambah. Ultimately the fire destroyed 776 acres of mature pines, 100 acres of young pines, caused at least 50,000 pounds (More than $2.1 million AUD in 2023) and 7,000 acres of grazing grasses.

===== Mountain Creek Fires =====
During 7 February through 4 March, several fires burned throughout the area. All were believed to be started by lightning on 5 February. The fires burnt three main areas;

1. Baldy Mountain, 7–15 February, 3,000 acres
2. California, 7–18 February, 1,500 acres
3. Bag Range, 7–24 February, 10,000 acres

==== 1956-57 ====
After a period of relatively little fire activity, when the FCT experienced an average of 11 minor fires per year through 1952-1957, dry conditions once again caused more severe conditions in the area. The Bush Fire Council attended at least 70 fires during this period. The largest within the FCT was at Hall, which burnt some 1,500 hectares. Others close by included;

- Captain's Flat (NSW) - 20 December 1956 (1,000 acres)
- Narrangullen near Wee Jasper (NSW) - Saturday 29 December 1956 (10,000 acres)
- Kershaw's property, Gundaroo-Bungendore Road (NSW.) - Monday 31 December 1956 (6,500 acres)
- 3 miles south of Williamsdale - west side of railway line (NSW.) - 4 January 1957 (2,000 acres + 300 sheep)
- West of Brindabella near "Brokenheart" (NSW) - Saturday 5 to 23 January 1957 (5,000 acres)
- Gundaroo-Collector Road (NSW) - 22 March 1957 (1,000 acres)

==== 1964 ====
During the 1964-65 season there were 140 outbreaks recorded, none of significance.

==== 1960 ====
Despite a Total Fire Ban being required from 7–9 February, there were only 33 fires recorded across the whole 1960-61 season.

==== 1979 ====
In 1978–79 a high fire danger in grasslands developed in late summer when extremely hot dry weather followed a period of substantial rain and prolific grass growth. On 13 February 1979 extreme fire weather conditions prevailed. A grassland fire danger rating of 70 (on a scale of 100) was calculated on the McArthur fire danger meter. This day was to become known as Black Tuesday. Several fires started in the ACT and nearby regions, one in particular began after being ignited from high tension power lines near Hall, and burnt into NSW towards the village of Sutton and Lake George. Twelve fires were attended by Bush Fire Council units that day. The maximum temperature reached was 39 degrees Celsius. The major fire started at Sunny Corner near the Village of Hall. It was first detected by the fire towers at 2.59 pm. Fanned by winds gusting to 70 kilometers per hour, the fire burnt fiercely in a northward direction and quickly grew in size spreading at an estimated 8 kilometers per hour at its worst.

At around 15:40 the fire approached the Gundaroo Road, around 4 kilometers from the source. Around 1620 hours the fire had reached Gungaderra Homestead (about 7 kilometers from the source), the fire was running in fully cured Phalaris grassland. The fire behaviour was erratic with flame bursts of 4 to 10 metres and huge fire whirls. The town of Sutton NSW was evacuated about 5 pm, when the fire reached the tops of nearby hills and began moving towards the town on a one-kilometer-wide front. A major wind change to the south-west occurred at about 1730 hours, the fire broke out along the entire northern flank and burnt strongly to the north east.

By the time the fire had been controlled, at about 4 am the next day, a total of 165 square kilometers (16 500 hectares) of land had been burnt; 4025ha in the ACT and 12475ha in New South Wales. The fire caused losses in the ACT of two cottages, three sheds, machinery and stored fodder, about 5000 sheep, six horses and fencing worth $200 000. On the same day there were other major outbreaks in the ACT at Mount Painter, Tuggeranong, near Kambah Pool and at Lands End Belconnen, where an ACT Fire Brigade Tanker was burnt out.

==== 1983 ====
In the ACT a fire started on 8 January 1983 down in the Gudgenby area and spread rapidly, burning for 22 days in rugged terrain before being contained. It was one of the largest and most difficult fires ever experienced in the ACT. It started near My Kelly, in the South-West corner of the A.C.T., on the evening of 8 January 1983 or early the following morning. The cause is unknown. Initial detection of the fire was seriously delayed because of poor visibility caused by heavy dust in the area on the morning of 9 January. A helicopter was dispatched immediately after the fire was reported, but by the time the fire was located it had already burnt 400 hectares and was spreading rapidly into inaccessible terrain. Although most damage occurred in the first 24 hours, rugged terrain and difficult access often prevented fire fighters from taking advantage of periods of favourable weather conditions. This resulted in the fire continuing and causing additional suppression problems when the weather conditions again worsened.

==== 1984 ====
In 1984–85, a relatively wet winter and spring was followed by an extremely dry summer. This caused a large buildup of plants and fuel for fires, which then rapidly dried out making it highly flammable. As a result, several large fires occur in forest and grassland reserves in and around Canberra, three of which burnt into NSW south of Queanbeyan.

The Majura fire was ignited under suspicious circumstances at 1326 hrs on 2 March 1985, on steep and inaccessible woodland on the southern slopes of Mount Majura; a day of extreme fire danger. Strong north-westerly winds soon drove the fire downhill into the Majura Pine Plantation before spotting across Majura Road into the Field Firing Range then eastwards through grass and woodland towards Sutton Road and eventually into Wamboin Estate in NSW.

Monday 4 March 1985 was another day of extreme weather and a Total Fire Ban remained in force. At 1534 hours several smoke sighting were called in to the Tharwa Road area. 7 fires were ignited along Tharwa Road, and crossed into the steep and heavily timbered Rob Roy ranges. By late afternoon of 4 March 1985, 6 major fires had run to the north, west and south of Queanbeyan with 2 fires directly threatening built-up areas. The fire burnt out of control up and over Rob Roy Range across the Monaro Highway into NSW before being brought under control. These fires resulted in the death of one person and the burning of 28,000 hectares, of which approximately 10,000 hectares were in the ACT

=== 1990s ===
The 1990s showed a rapid uptick in number of fires attended by the ACT Bushfire Service. Prior to 1990, the busiest fire season had 160 incidents. In 1990-91 this was 280, and in 1993-94 more than 300, and by 1997-98 there were 670.

==== 1997 ====
The Bushfire Season was declared early on 1 October 1997 and remained in force until 30 April 1998. During this time there were 34 Total Fire Bans. The most significant fires included;

- 19 November - Hindmarsh Drive, Symonston - 10ha
- 26 November - Mount MacDonald - 6ha
- 19 December - Point Hut Crossing - 10ha
- 19 December - Gossan Hill - 15ha
- 24–27 December - Mount Taylor - 50ha
- 26 December - Monaro Highway, Hume - 24ha

==== 1998 ====
The fire conditions from 1997 continued into 1998;

- 2 January - Dingi Dingi Range - 200ha
- 28 January - Melrose Pines - 60ha
- 24 February - Lower Molonglo River (Huntley)
- 22 March - Red Hill, Red Hill, 25ha

=== New millennium (2000-2003) ===
==== December 2001 fires ====
Whilst the fires of December 2001 were comparatively small in size they were notable in that they were the most serious fires to occur in the suburban areas of the Canberra for some years. On 24 December, fires lit by an arsonist on the Uriarra and Coppins Crossing Roads burnt rapidly through grassland and pine plantation, crossing the Tuggeranong Parkway. A fire started just east of the Canberra Airport in the late morning. It was caused by a youth playing with fireworks.

At 13:31 three of our four fire towers reported a smoke plume from the northwest corner of the pines in the vicinity of the "Huntly" Property on the Uriarra Road. This was called the Huntly fire. At 13:36 a second smoke plume was reported at "Kallenia Rivers", on Coppins Crossing Road, 4.5 km downwind from the first. This was called the Coppins Crossing fire. Both were reported to be building rapidly.

The Huntly fire was burning in grassland with scattered trees on a steep upper slope. The grass fire was spreading at faster than walking pace. It crowned in the trees along the roadside. The fire crossed the Uriarra Road and threatened to run towards the Mt Stromlo pine Plantation, the Adventure Paintball Park in its path. Suppression efforts halted the fire and kept this section of the fire to around 12 hectares. Crews were able to stop the main fire just as it reached a series of homesteads and sheds at Spring Vale, and even saved a full hay shed.

The fire burnt out 64 hectares and was stopped 130 metres short of the pine plantation on Mount Stromlo. It took many days to reopen the Uriarra Road, due to the danger from falling trees – chainsaw operators were in high demand.

The Coppins Crossing fire spread rapidly in grazing land down to the Molonglo River. Before crews could round it up, it crossed the river and started an uphill run in the Greenhills pine plantation. With a mix of slash, young pines and mature pines, the fire behaviour was variable - but always spectacular.

At this point, with the fire spotting up to 300 metres. It threatened the edges of five Canberra suburbs — Duffy, Holder, Weston, Yarralumla and Curtin. The Emergency Services Bureau issued the SEWS (the Standard Emergency Warning Signal) alert to the community for the first time, along with advice to the residents of those suburbs to take certain steps to increase their safety.

The fire crossed the main north–south road in Canberra (Tuggeranong Parkway) and burnt down to the shores of Lake Burley Griffin. It entered the grounds of both the National Zoo & Aquarium and the Governor-General's residence. The Parkway road and many others in the area would remain closed for many days, again due to the threat from falling trees.

The fire veered a little to the right and burnt right to the edge of the suburb of Curtin, and in fact to within 800m of the Emergency Services Bureau. Around here it threatened Forest Park Riding School, Two Sisters Motel, the Yarralumla Woolshed, the Joint Services Staff College, the RSPCA and a number of sites on Heritage Lists.

This fire destroyed millions of dollars of plantation pines, and eventually burnt out many hectares. In its last run it crossed another of our main arterial roads, Adelaide Avenue, and was pulled up next to the Royal Australian Mint.

The exact area of this fire will never be known because it was overrun by a third fire, which was lit deliberately upwind at 14:56. This fire (the Blewitts Fire) was lit in very heavy pine slash 1.5 km upwind. In such heavy fuels (up to 150 tonnes per hectare) it burnt ferociously and could not be approached. Even though burning downslope, the wind was sufficient to quickly whip it into a spreading fire. Later a pipe bomb was defused, by the Police Bomb Squad, near where this fire reached the crews working on the Coppins Crossing fire.

The two fires merged and became the Stromlo Fire. The Stromlo Fire burnt a total of over 1200 hectares which included around 500 hectares of pine plantation and a plantation of Roman Cypress trees.

At 16:00, just after a fire tower reported winds at 90 km/h, we had a fire reported at the foot of Red Hill. This Nature Park is just south of the Lake Burly Griffith, borders many embassies and is surrounded by suburbs. It was also downwind of the other three fires. This fire quickly raced uphill and crowned. This forced the evacuation of the Red Hill Carousel Restaurant which remained closed for several days.

It eventually burnt 170 hectares while switching between uphill and downhill runs, often as a crown fire.

At the same time that the Red Hill fire was reported, another fire was reported on Bruce Ridge next to the Australian Institute of Sport. This fire was also in Nature Park, in Scribbly Gum and Stringybark woodland, and rapidly became a crown fire. It was 5 km upwind of the heart of Canberra and added another large smoke plume to the urban landscape. A youth hostel in Dryandra Street was evacuated. In all 100 hectares of this park was burned.

On Christmas Day around 11.00am a fire was lit on Canberra Avenue opposite HMAS Harman and burnt towards Oaks Estate, which is an outer suburb of Canberra, just across the railway line from Queanbeyan. It burnt 100 hectares and was stopped from entering an industrial estate and from jumping the railway line.

At 2.30pm a fire was lit on Wanniassa Hills above the southern suburb of McArthur. It was rounded up just before reaching houses, and was small at 17 hectares. There were many other smaller fires like the 10 hectare fire that burnt into the grounds at the Canberra University.

By 9 am on Boxing Day the Country Fire Authority had an advance incident management team working with the ACT incident control team in Curtin, and by 3.30 pm that day, some 56 CFA Volunteer firefighters with 10 tankers were deployed to the Stromlo fire. Late on Thursday, these CFA crews were released and departed to assist NSW.

Helicopters proved invaluable at all of the fires. It was so easy for fires to crown that it was consistently difficult for direct attack to succeed. No backburning was undertaken, partly because there was often no room for one to work, and partly because with the strong winds there was little margin for error. The fact that the winds held on WNW for so long made suppression easier for crews.

From around lunchtime Christmas Eve to 8.00 pm Christmas Day, apart from the five major fires, there were another 33 fires responded to. All up over 1600 hectares were burnt with over 50 km of fire perimeters to patrol, and for up to three weeks afterwards smoke could be seen rising from the fire grounds. No-one was killed, there were few injuries, and no structures were lost (apart from some minor rural ones). They threatened the suburbs of Duffy, Holder, Weston, Yarralumla and Curtin and burnt to the shores of Lake Burley Griffin, destroying 510 hectares of pine plantation.

==== 2003 fires ====
The 2003 Canberra bushfires are regarded as the most damaging and disastrous in the history of the ACT, and among the worst in Australia. During 2002 and into 2003, most of Australia experienced one of the most severe droughts on record.

On 7 and 8 January 2003 there were numerous lightning strikes over the Australia Alps, which ignited at least 89 fires in Victoria, 74 in NSW and three in the ACT. This would go on to cause the 2003 Canberra bushfires.

Those fires not controlled, burnt for over 60 days and eventually covered 1.96 million hectares. Four of these fires directly affected the ACT, starting in the western rangers on 8 January 2003, and gradually increased in size over the following 9 days. Due to severe weather conditions experienced on the 18th the fires spread rapidly out of control across Namadgi National Park, pine plantations and leased grazing lands towards Canberra. Fire then entered into the suburbs of Weston Creek between 2 pm and 6 pm resulting in the deaths of four ACT residents and the burning of 164,000 hectares (or nearly 70%) of land in the territory. Over 500 houses and most of the Mt Stromlo Observatory were destroyed, fire damage to a further 315 houses, and major damage to various infrastructure and facilities. Ninety percent of Namadgi National Park was burnt (much of it severely) and severe fire damage occurred to the Tidbinbilla Nature Reserve, the Murrumbidgee River Corridor, the Stromlo Pine plantation and pine plantation west of the Murrumbidgee River. The fires also effected the ACT water catchment, and as a result Canberra's water supply.

=== Black Summer (2019-20) ===
During the summer of 2019–2020, most of the eastern Australian states experienced severe fires, in what became known as the Black Summer fires. While the city itself of Canberra fared better than many neighbouring areas of NSW, the territory itself was not unaffected. The most significant fire during the period was the Orroral Valley fire. Immediately before the ignition of the fire, the ACT had already recorded its hottest day on record – 44 °C on 4 January 2020

==== 2020 ====
The Orroral Valley fire was started when an Army helicopter landed for a toilet break in the Orroral Valley, south of Canberra on 27 January 2020. It was ignited at approximately 1330, by 1425 had burned grown to 20 hectares and by 1800 was 18,000ha.

Once the ACT Emergency Services Agency were aware of the fire an initial attack assignment consisting of 19 appliances and 13 aircraft were deployed, but due to the isolated and rough terrain there was little that could be done to limit its spread.

== Fire Authorities ==
See also ACT Rural Fire Service

During the history of the ACT, responsibility for bushfires has predominantly rested with the ACT Rural Fire Service, supported by ACT Fire and Rescue and their respective predecessors.
