= Rural Fire Service =

Rural Fire Service can mean any of the following:

In Australia:

- Australian Capital Territory Rural Fire Service
- New South Wales Rural Fire Service
- The Rural Fire Service Queensland is a part of the Queensland Fire Department
