= Gregor Manson =

Australian Capital Territory Emergency Services Agency Commissioner
- In office 2006–2009
- Preceded by: Peter Dunn

Gregor Manson is the former Commissioner for the Australian Capital Territory Emergency Services Agency (ACT ESA), an agency of the ACT Department of Justice & Community Safety. The ACT ESA is responsible for the ACT Fire Brigade, ACT Ambulance Service, Rural Fire Service and State Emergency Service. He was appointed to the position in 2006, following the resignation of Peter Dunn

Manson had earlier been an executive director with the Great Barrier Reef Marine Park Authority and prior to that had a background in forestry with the NSW National Parks and Wildlife Service regions of the Greater Blue Mountains and the Snowy Region (including Kosciusko National Park).
