= Community Fire Unit =

Community Fire Units (CFUs) are volunteer teams of residents who are trained as preliminary responders to bushfires in the Australian Capital Territory and New South Wales until the fire brigade arrives and in bushfire prevention. They are not to be confused with Volunteer Fire and Bushfire Brigades, which usually have vehicles and stations and are equipped for significant fire suppression duties.

Reduce the impact of bushfires on the community and to protect life and property from bushfires.

The Community Fire Units are not by any means intended to replace traditional professional and volunteer fire brigades. The CFUs are intended only to take proactive action to prevent danger to property and lives and to act in the interim to respond to a fire emergency until the fire brigade arrive. The CFUs are in a sense to the Fire Brigade what Neighbourhood Watch is to the police.

CFUs are typically equipped with an inventory of essential fire fighting equipment, often in a trailer. These can include hoses and hydrants, bush clearing tools, protecting clothing and communications devices. Unlike brigades, CFUs have no permanent vehicles or station, relying on the resources of volunteers.

== NSW Community Fire Units ==
Fire and Rescue NSW maintains 600 CFUs and more than 7,000 volunteer members across metropolitan and regional NSW.

A few NSW Rural Fire Service Brigades also maintain their own CFUs. Members of these CFUs are also members of the specific rural fire brigade. They are trained in basic fire safety and fighting and who can assist the Fire Brigade in case of fire emergencies and other incidents.

== ACT Community Fire Units ==
ACT Fire and Rescue maintains 50 CFUs with about 850 volunteer members. The disastrous 2003 Canberra bushfires impacted significant urban areas of the city of Canberra, destroying over 400 homes and killing four people. The ACT Government introduced a similar program of CFUs based on the NSW model. Communities organise volunteers to form local units who on application, may receive a community fire fighting unit trailer with fire fighting equipment and the appropriate clothing and protective equipment for each volunteer. In the ACT, CFU volunteers are identified by blue clothing, to distinguish from the fire brigade's yellow attire.
