= Australian Capital Territory Rural Fire Service =

Government agency firefighting branch

ACT Rural Fire Service

Operational area
- Country: Australia
- Territory: Australian Capital Territory

Agency overview
- Established: 1 July 2004
- Annual calls: 173 (2020–21)
- Employees: 28 Staff (2020–21)
- Staffing: 501 volunteers
- Commissioner: Wayne Phillips
- Fire chief: Rohan Scott

Facilities and equipment
- Stations: 9 Brigades (8 volunteer and PCS Fire)
- Helicopters: 3

Website
- http://esa.act.gov.au/actrfs/

The ACT Rural Fire Service is the volunteer firefighting branch of the Australian Capital Territory Emergency Services Agency (ESA). It is responsible for the prevention, detection and extinguishment of all bushfires within the ACT, as well as assisting the other branches of ESA.

== History ==
See also Bushfires in the Australian Capital Territory

=== Early history ===
There are very few records regarding bushfires in the Australian Capital Territory (then known as the Limestone Plains) from the early 1800s to the first quarter of the twentieth century.

In December 1903 two bush fire brigades were formed: The Limestone Plains Brigade and The "Majura Corps".

==== Canberra Bush Fires Prevention Committee ====
The Canberra Bush Fires Prevention Committee was formed around 1905, made up of landowners in the local area.

=== First Brigades ===
Sometime after Limestone Plains Brigade and the "Majura Corps" formed, the Weetangara Fire Brigade was also formed. Again the Queanbeyan Age from Tuesday 18 January 1910 reports "The Weetangara Fire Brigade burnt several firebreaks around the various holdings before Christmas. Mr. Crace kindly lent his fire-fighter for the purpose."

==== Federal Territory Bushfire Association ====
On 28 October 1915, the Federal Territory Bush Fire Association was formed. The purpose of the Association was

"the organised assistance of all concerned, and the co-ordination of effort in

(a) the prevention of bush or grass fires in the territory and adjoining country;

(b) the adoption of necessary measures for combating any outbreak of bush or grass fire in the territory and the adjoining country."

On 8 November 1927 the Lands Department of the Federal Capital Commission set up the Bush Fire Organisation to deal with bushfires for the upcoming summer. For the first time the organization would supply Fire fighting equipment such as water carts, fire beaters and rakes as well as establishing depots for fire-fighting appliances at the homes or camps of certain rangers in Canberra. On Monday 14 November 1927 the Bush Fire Control Organization had its inaugural meeting. The Chief Fire Controller was Mr M. R. Jacobs (Chief Forester). The organization set up fire depots at MacDonald's Camp near Weetangera, Weavers' Property near Stromlo, Maxwells' Property at The Rivers, Gregorys' Property at Kambah and Horans' Property near the Yarralumla. The equipment at these depots included fire carts, beaters, rakes & axes, with horses for the fire carts being supplied by various Rural Lessees.

In 1932 the Gundaroo Volunteer Bushfire Brigade was formed, closely followed by the Wallaroo Bush Fire Brigade in 1940. Today, both these brigades are part of the NSW Rural Fire Service.

=== ACT Bush Fire Council ===
The severe bushfires which caused widespread damage in the Australian Capital Territory in January 1939 was the subject of enquiry by a Bush Fire Committee appointed by the Minister of State for the Interior, the Honorable J. McEwen, M.P.; among the recommendations was one favouring the appointment of a permanent Bush Fire Council to organise the prevention and suppression of bushfires in the ACT. The ACT Bushfire Council is the direct predecessor of the current ACT All Hazards Advisory Council.

The Careless Use of the A.C.T. Fire Ordinance 1936–37, was amended in 1940 to provide for the formation of a Bush Fire Council. From the 1940s a greater emphasis on planned burning was introduced in the ACT as a means of reducing the potential for severe bushfires. Additionally, the first two Bushfire Districts were declared –

At the close of 1944 four official bushfire brigades were operating in the ACT. The Brigades were;

- Mulligan's Flat,
- Weetangera,
- Tuggeranong, and
- Hall

Only Hall is still in existence by name as of 2025.

The year 1951 saw the formation of two new brigades. The first meeting of the Tidbinbilla Bush Fire Brigade was 25 February 1951, before bring formally recognised by the Bushfire Council in September of the same year. Additionally, a brigade was created within the Parks and Gardens Section of the Department of the Interior.

=== Post-War Years ===
After the disastrous bushfires of 1951/52 and following representations by the Bush Fire Council in mid-1952, a number of additional volunteer Bush Fire Brigades were formed. These were

- Woden Bush Fire Brigade – formed 16 July 1952
- Majura Bush Fire Brigade – formed 11 December 1956
- Naas Bush Fire Brigade – formed November 1966

=== Volunteer Bushfire Brigades Association ===
The inaugural meeting of the Volunteer Bush Fire Brigades Association was held on 22 November 1984. Its original objectives/roles were:

1. To act as a focal point for issues affecting all volunteer bushfire fighters in the A.C.T. (there were some 828 members on the various Brigades' books at the time).
2. Speak on behalf of all A.C.T. volunteer bushfire fighters.
3. Lobby politicians, bureaucrats & national/local organisations on issues relating to A.C.T. volunteer bushfire fighters.
4. Provide a forum for discussing improvements to fire management in the A.C.T.
5. Put forward a joint and considered view to the Emergency Management Group and A.C.T. Government officials on equipment, training, planning and safety issues affecting A.C.T. volunteer bushfire fighters.
6. Publicise issues on behalf of A.C.T. volunteer bushfire fighters where and when necessary.
7. Organise public events (Field Days) to make the community more aware of the work done by volunteer bushfire fighters.
8. Provide an Avenue for transmission of practical suggestions from the people who actually put out a high percentage of the rural fires in the A.C.T.

After the 1979 Black Tuesday fires, the Hall Volunteer Bush Fire Brigade was re-formed after a period of inactivity, with 14 members at the time.

In 1986, after severe fires in the Jerrabomberra area a public meeting was held in October, resulting in the formation of the Jerrabomberra Volunteer Bush Fire Brigade on 11 November 1986.

The Williamsdale Bush Fire Brigade was split into two during 1988, with half forming Guises Creek Volunteer Bushfire Brigade and the other half becoming part of the NSW Rural Fire Service as Williamsdale Bush Fire Brigade.

The final brigade to be formed by the ACT Bush Fire Council was in October, 1989 when the Rivers Volunteer Bushfire Brigade was established to cover the area previously covered by the Fairlight-The Rivers Brigade.

=== Emergency Services Bureau Era ===
Until around 1990 Rural Fire Brigades had been manned by landholders, their families and their employees. This system had worked well enough up to a stage with landholders attending fires, for the most part close to home. But with the growth of urban Canberra, Rivers Brigade made the decision to recruit members from suburbs lying close to the brigade's area. Many young people volunteered and the system has worked well, but with a high turn-over of members, but a consistent nucleus of dedicated members have stayed.

The ACT Emergency services went through a major restructure in November 1996, where several brigades and units from other emergency services were relocated, and Molonglo and Gungahlin brigades were established and the ACT Bush Fire Council was renamed ACT Bush Fire Brigades, being brought under the umbrella of the newly created ACT Emergency Services Bureau, alongside the ACT State Emergency Service, ACT Fire and Rescue and ACT Ambulance Service.

The restructure was achieved at the Rivers, Guises Creek, Jerrabomberra and Headquarters Brigades by building additional shed space as required to accommodate Australian Capital Territory Emergency Service (ACT SES) equipment. No Australian Capital Territory Emergency Service volunteers were moved to the Southern Districts or Tidbinbilla Volunteer Bushfire Brigades.

The new Gungahlin Brigade was located in rented warehouse space in the industrial area of Mitchell until completion of the new Joint Emergency Services Centre at Gungahlin Town Centre.

=== Post-2003 – Formation of the ACT Rural Fire Service ===
Partly as a result of the McLeod enquiry after the 2003 Fires, the service was renamed the ACT Rural Fire Service and brought under the umbrella of the ACT Emergency Services Agency. The ACT RFS has undertaken a major modernization program since 2003 after the McLeod enquiry, including the building new fire sheds, buying new appliances, recruiting more firefighters, upskilling current firefighters, maintaining and improving the Remote Area Fire Teams capabilities and taking part in research around bushfires, particularly in the use of Compressed air foam system.

The same report and fires also lead to the Emergencies Act 2004, which continued and clarified the role of the extant ACT Bush Fire Council. In 2021, this council was renamed the ACT Multi Hazard Advisory Council.

== Rural Fire Brigades ==
Brigades form the functional organisational unit of the ACT Rural Fire Service. Each member of the RFS is a member of their individual brigade. Each brigade is responsible for the organisation of its membership, running "brigade based" training and ensuring availability for incidents.

Each brigade has a captain, who is the overall leader of the brigade, and a number of deputy captains who work as the Captains delegate, lead the brigade in most activities, and generally should undertake frontline command and control responsibilities. These roles are generally elected by secret ballot at an individual Brigades Annual General Meeting. To support the operational functions and capability, brigades will also elect a number of Administrative positions who form the executive committee.

A Brigades Executive Committees administer the assets and facilities of the Brigade and is made up of members who have no incident or brigade command and control responsibilities.

=== Current Brigades ===
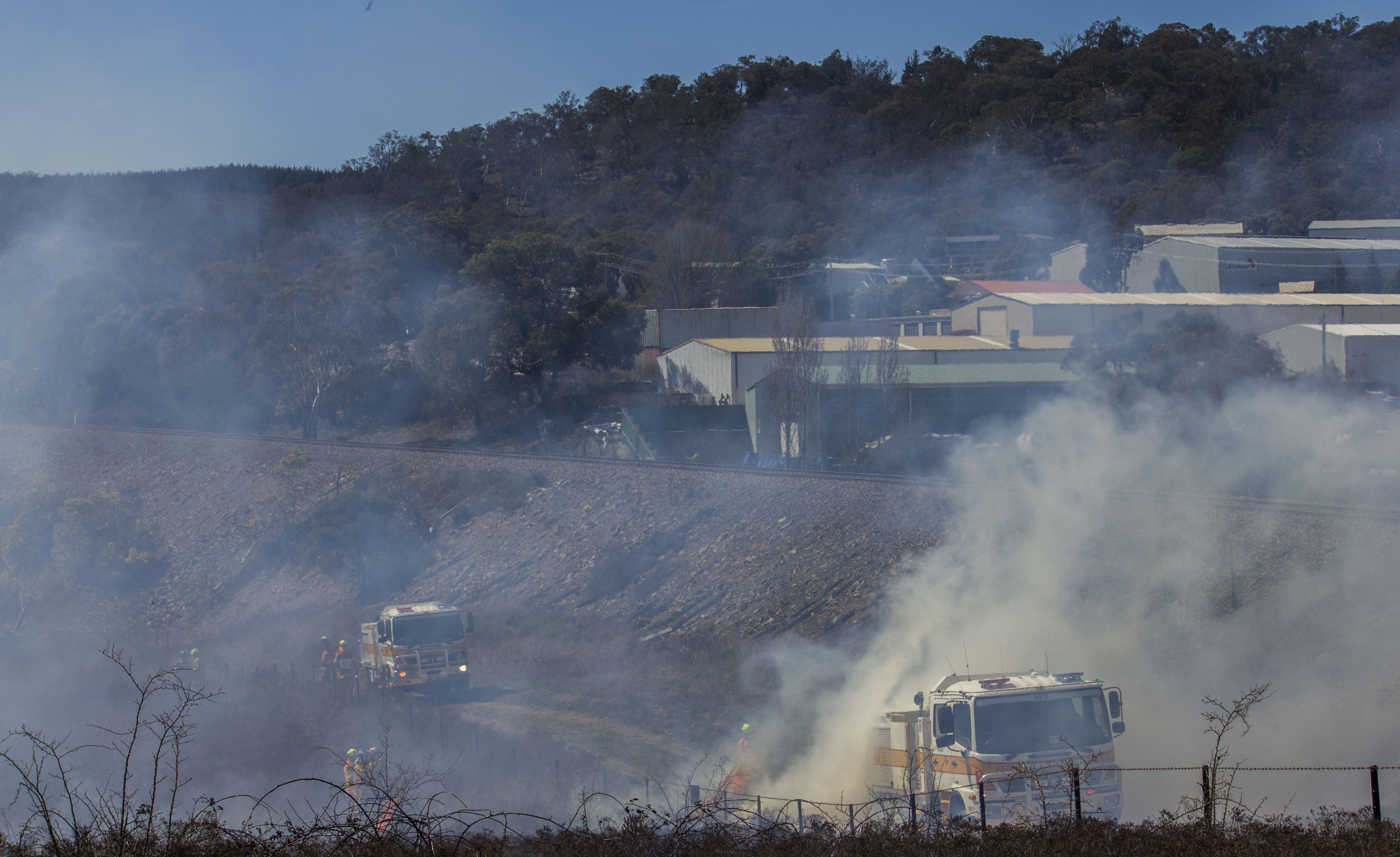
Two 10 Tankers assisting in the Hazard Reduction Burn September 2013

The ACT RFS has nine RFS Brigades are generally focused on the western areas of the ACT as most fires come with winds from the Brindabella Ranges of the Namadgi National Park and Kosciuszko National Park to the west of the ACT.

==== Gungahlin Volunteer Bush Fire Brigade ====
Gungahlin Brigade
Callsign	GUN
Location	Building 3, 9 Sandford Street, Mitchell ACT 2911
Heavy Tankers	2
Medium Tankers	2
Light Tankers	
Other Units	Command, Pumps Trailer

Gungahlin brigade is based in Mitchell, having been previously based at the Gungahlin Joint Emergency Services Complex (JESC) located in the central business area of the most northern town centre in the ACT. The Gungahlin Volunteer Bushfire & Emergency Service Brigade commenced operations on Sunday 9 February 1997. The bushfire component of the brigade initially drew its membership for the Hall and Jerrabomberra Volunteer Brigades. The initial membership consisted of 15 members and the brigade was resourced with: Heavy Tanker (single cabin Isuzu), 1 Light Unit (Toyota Land Cruiser) and 1 Command Vehicle (Toyota Hilux)

The brigade was initially stationed at Mitchell (corner of Heffernan St and Winchcombe Ct). The brigade was relocated to the Gungahlin Joint Emergency Services Centre (JESC) in 1998. The Brigade were heavily involved in the 2001 Christmas fires and were the first (and only for the first 1.5 hours) bushfire units on scene at the Bruce Ridge fire as it spread from near the CIT and encircled the Lyneham Caravan Park. Gungahlin Brigade was heavily involved in operations in the Tidbinbilla Nature Reserve and Tidbinbilla Valley during the 2003 Canberra bushfires on 17 January 2003 and in the Uriarra Settlement and Weston Creek area on 18 January 2003. The brigade was able to provide crews for at least one shift for 17 days straight during this campaign event.

Gungahlin busiest day for fire activity was Saturday 13 March 1999 which saw the brigade respond to and contain seventeen fires in the one day. This was also coupled with the busiest weekend for the brigade that saw the brigade attend over 30 fires over the three days of the Canberra Day Long Weekend.

In 2024 the Brigade re-located back to Mitchell, to Sandford Street, not far from their original location.

==== Hall Volunteer Bush Fire Brigade ====
Hall Brigade
Callsign	HALL
Location	17 Loftus Street, Hall ACT 2618
Heavy Tankers	3
Medium Tankers	1
Light Tankers	1
Other Units	Command

Hall brigade is based in the rural village of Hall, aimed at protecting and educating the northern ACT community of Hall and surrounding areas about bushfires. The Hall Bush Fire Brigade was first established in the summer of 1943–44. A bus shelter/fire equipment shed was erected about this time, opposite the Hall Premier Store, from material salvaged from the old Mulligan's Flat School. The shed housed leather beaters, McLeod tools, knap-sack sprays etc. A hand pump used at this time to transfer water is still in the Brigade's Shed.

A 2000-gallon water tank was erected on a high stand on the north/west corner of Victoria and Gladstone Streets, as a fire fighting water source and it was kept full by a Government water tanker. The water supply to Hall had been under consideration for many years. With further persistence from the Hall Progress Association the long-awaited water supply for the Village of Hall became a reality in 1967. The official turning on of the water was performed by the minister, the Hon. J.D. Anthony M.P. on 1 April 1967. At this time a length of canvas and a stand-pipe was given to the village by the A.C.T. Fire Brigade, who showed the locals how to operate them. The new equipment was stored in a box at the Estate Agent's Office (Dalgety's) in Victoria Street.

The original Brigade died out sometime around the late 1960s, partly due to a lack of equipment and also because most residents worked away from the village and were not available during the day. On 13 February 1979, known as "Black Tuesday", a fire started at "Sunny Corner". The majority of losses were in the Hall district. The cause of the fire was a drop-out fuse from a high tension powerline. After the "Black Tuesday" fire, Jim Rochford gathered together a group of locals and in October 1979 under C.F.C.O. Cliff Parsons a new era of the Hall Volunteer Bushfire Brigade commenced. The new Brigade had 14 financial members. The new Brigade's first vehicle was a 4WD Toyota Landcruiser, complete with pump and tank, which was presented to the Brigade in November 1979 by the C.F.C.O. Cliff Parsons.

In 1982 the A.C.T. Bush Fire Council presented the Brigade with a 1962 Bedford tanker (3500 Litres capacity). This vehicle was 'retired' in September 1990, and was loaned to the neighbouring Wallaroo Brigade in N.S.W. A 3-door fire shed was erected in Loftus Street in 1985 after years of negotiations. It was officially opened by the Governor-General, Sir Ninian Stephen, on 19 April 1986. This was the first of the new Government-sponsored fire sheds in the A.C.T.

==== Molonglo Volunteer Bush Fire Brigade ====
Molonglo Brigade
Callsign	MLO
Location	Drake-Brockman Drive, Higgins
Heavy Tankers	2
Medium Tankers	2
Light Tankers	0
Other Units	Command, Pumps Trailer

Molonglo brigade is based at Higgins, covering West Belconnen. During the implementation of the restructure in 1996 a new volunteer Bushfire and Emergency Service Brigade was proposed to be formed in the West Belconnen area, which was under-served by bushfire fighting capability. Once funds were earmarked to build a shed for this brigade it quickly became more than a proposal and a meeting of volunteers was held on 6 May 1997 to form the Brigade and decide on a name. As much of the region served by the new Brigade is bordered by the Molonglo River before its confluence with the Murrumbidgee River, "Molonglo" was the name adopted.

Molonglo Brigade membership initially comprised some of the more experienced bushfire members of the Hall Volunteer Bushfire Brigade and some of the Emergency Service members who had originally opted to relocate to the Hall Volunteer Bushfire Brigade (prior to the proposal to form Molonglo Brigade). This was topped up over the next few months as new members joined and by the end of 1997 most of these had been trained to basic skills level. The Brigade Executive was elected at the inaugural Molonglo Volunteer Bushfire and Emergency Service Brigade Annual General Meeting on 24 September 1997 and the new Constitution was formally adopted on 22 October 1997.

==== Rivers Volunteer Bush Fire Brigade ====
Rivers Brigade
Callsign	RIV
Location	903 Cotter Road, Stromlo ACT 2611
Heavy Tankers	3
Medium Tankers	1
Light Tankers	1
Other Units	Command, RIV19 (Bulk Water)

Rivers brigade is located on the Cotter Road approximately 1 km west turn off to the Mount Stromlo Observatory, and is unique in that it is co-located with the ACT State Emergency Service Unit. At the inaugural meeting of the Bush Fire Control Organisation on 14 November 1927, it directed that a number of fire depots were to be set up, including one at The Rivers property. The homestead on The Rivers was then situated adjacent to Uriarra Road,

After the disastrous bushfires of 1951/52 and following representations by the Bush Fire Council in mid-1952, a number of volunteer Bush Fire Brigades were formed including the Rivers Bush Fire Brigade. It was decided that The Rivers Brigade would be conducted jointly with the Fairlight/Uriarra Brigade. Around 1962 the brigades merged and renamed themselves the Fairlight-The Rivers Bush Fire Brigade.

In 1972, because of the urban development in the Weston Creek and Kambah areas, it was decided to merge the remnant areas of the Kambah Bush Fire Brigade with Fairlight-The Rivers Bush Fire Brigade. This composite brigade was called Uriarra-Stromlo-Central South and Fairlight (in N.S.W.). The area covered included the old Fairlight-The Rivers Brigade area plus land lying east to Jerrabomberra Creek, south to Kambah Pool Road and running up to the Cotter Road, excluding urban areas. In 1980 Bush Fire Council allocated a Bedford tanker to this composite brigade, to be garaged at Fairlight.

At a meeting on 31 August 1989, the Fairlight Bush Fire Brigade decided to confine its operations to New South Wales. At the instigation of Bush Fire Council a public meeting was held on 10 October 1989, at Stomlo Depot, to decide if a new Bush Fire Brigade should be set up covering the old Fairlight-The Rivers Brigade area in the A.C.T. The meeting voted in favour of setting up a new brigade. On 11 October 1989 BFC endorsed the formation of the new Brigade.

At the Brigade's AGM on 29 October 1992, it was decided to write to the Australian Capital Territory BFC requesting a permanent fire shed be built for the Brigade. For the next couple of years various sites were proposed, offers made and withdrawn. In September 1994 the Brigade was given the temporary use of the old CSIRO's experimental sawmill site on the corner of Eucumbene Drive and Cotter Road.

In September 1995 a site was offered by Australian Capital Territory Forests just off the Cotter Road. On Thursday 13 June 1996 construction was commenced and on Sunday 1 December 1996 the Brigade moved into their new home. The Australian Capital Territory Government in November 1996 made the decision to co-locate Australian Capital Territory Emergency Service (ACT SES) personnel with the volunteer bushfire brigades and on 1 February a number of Emergency Service volunteers from the Phillip Depot moved into the Rivers Shed. Shortly after a second shed was constructed on the site to provide a training room and additional storage/vehicle garaging for the Brigade. Finally some 70 years after the Bush Fire Control Organisation first set up a fire depot in the Rivers area, the Minister for Australian Capital Territory Police and Emergency Services, Gary Humphries opened the Rivers Shed on Saturday 21 June 1997.

==== Jerrabomberra Volunteer Bush Fire Brigade ====
Jerrabomberra Brigade
Callsign	JER
Location	273 Jerrabomberra Avenue, Symonston ACT 2619
Heavy Tankers	3
Medium Tankers	1
Light Tankers	1
Other Units	Command, Pumps Trailer, BW19 (Bulk Water)

Jerrabomberra RFS Brigade is named after the Jerrabomberra Valley and is now based in Symonston and covers the central and eastern rural areas of the ACT including areas of Mt Ainslie, Mt Mugga, Red Hill, Isaacs Ridge, Kowen Forest. It began as the Woden Bush Fire Brigade which had its inaugural meeting on 16 July 1952. The Brigade was formed after the devastating fires swept through the Jerrabomberra Valley area earlier that year. Its first AGM was held on 17 September 1952.

The Woden Brigade purchased a unit from funds raised, and limited equipment was provided from the A.C.T. Bush Fire Council. Over the next 20 years or so the Woden Brigade fought fires in the A.C.T. and surrounding area before finally disbanding in the 1970s. Once again after many fires swept through the Jerrabomberra Valley in 1985 and 1986 a proposal was put forward that another volunteer bushfire brigade be formed. A public meeting was held on 29 October 1986, with the Jerrabomberra VBB being officially formed on 11 November 1986.

The A.C.T. Bush Fire Council provided Jerrabomberra VBB with a light unit. The Jerrabomberra Fire Shed was officially opened on 2 May 1992. Around mid 1994 an extension to the Jerrabomberra Fire Shed was commenced, it was constructed in two stages, the first was completed and opened on 3 December 1994. The second stage was completed and opened on 1 April 1995. The extension was built from funds raised by the Brigade and assistance from the A.C.T. Rural Fire Service.

==== Guises Creek Volunteer Bush Fire Brigade ====
Guises Creek Brigade
Callsign	G/CK
Location	8686 Monaro Highway, Tuggeranong / Cnr Monaro Highway and Old Cooma Rd, ACT 2901
Heavy Tankers	3
Medium Tankers	1
Light Tankers	1
Other Units	Command

The Guises Creek Rural Fire Brigade is located on the corner of Old Cooma Road and the Monaro Highway, near Royalla, New South Wales. Its history goes back to the Williamsdale Bush Fire Brigade which was formed in 1957. The first fire vehicle was a private truck with a 200-gallon water tank, a Finsberry pump and a valve 2-way radio. In the 1960s the Brigade purchased a 1942 Chev "Biltz" unit from the N.S.W. Forestry Department at Bateman's Bay for 300 pounds. This unit had served as a decontamination unit in World War II; it has been restored and retained for promotional and heritage use. In 1988 the Brigade split into two; these were the Williamsdale Bush Fire Brigade (N.S.W.) and the Guises Creek Volunteer Bushfire Brigade (A.C.T.).

Guises Creek Brigades' catchment area lies on the eastern side of the Tuggeranong Valley; it is made up of 15 rural leases, the Murrumbidgee River Corridor and the Rob Roy Range Nature Park. On 18 June 1994, the Guises Creek Fire Shed was officially opened by the A.C.T. Minister for Urban Services, David Lamont MLA.

==== Southern Districts Volunteer Bush Fire Brigade ====
Southern Brigade
Callsign	SOU
Location	Tharwa North Street (behind Tharwa Hall), Tharwa ACT 2620
Heavy Tankers	2
Medium Tankers	2
Light Tankers	1
Other Units	Command, Pumps Trailer, BW90 (Bulk Water)

Southern brigade, based at Tharwa, combines a rural base with closesness to the city, covering the southern area of the ACT, from Lanyon to the NSW border.

==== Tidbinbilla Volunteer Bush Fire Brigade ====
Tidbinbilla Brigade
Callsign	TID
Location	Tidbinbilla Road, ACT 2620
Heavy Tankers	1
Medium Tankers	1
Light Tankers	1
Other Units	Command, Pumps Trailer

Tidbinbilla Brigade (established on 25 February 1951), began as a group of landholders from the Tidbinbilla Valley and the surrounding region, and serves as the forefront unit for fires coming from the Brindabella Ranges. The Tidbinbilla Bush Fire Brigade was formed at a meeting held on 25 February 1951 at Mr H Woods' homestead. There were 14 local residents at that meeting and the first action taken was the purchase of a Dangar Gedye & Malloch fire fighting unit, from Gibbs & Co, Queanbeyan, at a cost of 180 pounds and 2 knapsack sprays for 7 pounds 18 shillings 6 pence. To raise the money a levy of 15 shillings per hundred head of sheep was set. A selected landholder took responsibility for the fire fighting unit for 12 months. On 25 November 1953, a transceiver set No. 21 was fitted to Flint Brothers' truck. The equipment for the 1954/55 season consisted of one 2-way radio, 2 knapsack sprays, 1x200 gallons (910 L) tank and 1 reel.

From the 1955/56 season the main equipment was permanently stationed at Congwarra, with water bags, metal knapsack sprays, beaters, rakes, tanks and hoses supplied to each landholder. In 1963 big changes took place. The then Fauna Reserve (formerly Rock Valley) was withdrawn from the Tidbinbilla Bush Fire Brigade area, and the Tidbinbilla Tracking Station had become operational. In 1968 the out-dated radio was replaced by a transistorised model, the metal knapsacks were replaced by lighter polythene units, and members were given McLeod tools and water tanks by the Bush Fire Council. A fire tanker, International K6 5 ton truck was purchased from the Department of the Interior in 1969, and it could carry 800 gallons of water.

In 1979 the Bush Fire Council provided a Toyota 4-wheel drive Light Unit and more fire equipment. For a time the International K6 was kept as a backup vehicle, until it had out worn its usefulness and was put up for sale. The area covered by the Tidbinbilla Bush Fire Brigade has decreased over the years, with the extension of ACT Forests (now TAMS) into the valley, the Fauna Reserve became Tidbinbilla Nature Reserve, linked to Namadgi National Park and both Tidbinbilla Tracking Station and Birrigai took over rural land. However, with an increase in traffic and a wider use of the area by the public, the danger of fires has increased.

==== ACT Parks and Conservation Service Brigade ====
Parks Brigade
Callsign	PCS
Location	Various
Heavy Tankers	6
Medium Tankers	3
Light Tankers	8
Other Units	Command Units (multiple), RAFT Trailer

The Parks Brigade, is a brigade made up of personnel from the ACT Parks and Conservation Service and is supplemented during the fire season with full-time seasonal firefighters. At some point the ACT Forests Brigade was merged into the Parks brigade.

==== Other Functions ====
===== Remote Area Fire Teams =====
Remote Area Fire Teams (RAFT) Brigade
Callsign	
Location	ACTRFS Helibase, 63 David Warren Road, Hume ACT 2620
Heavy Tankers	N/A
Medium Tankers	N/A
Light Tankers	N/A
Other Units	Command, Trailers (Various)

Historically, each brigade was responsible for the management of their own Remote Area qualified members and RAFT equipment, through brigade based role of "RAFT Coordinator". After the 2019/20 season, this role was removed and all RAFT qualified members are managed centrally. These members remain members of their core brigade, but are managed through a single RAFT Coordinator and common equipment cache. This equipment and "station" is located at the ACT Rural Fire Service Helibase in Hume.

===== Aviation =====
ACT RFS uses various contracted aircraft for aerial firefighting. This typically consists of two Helitack machines, supported by Firebird 100. Firebird 100 is an AS 350B3 Squirrel Helicopter, which is used for intelligence gathering at both bush and grassfires and supporting other agencies.

===== Community Fire Units =====
Additionally, local community fire units (CFU) are organised on the margins of the ACT's rural boundary, with members drawn from residents of suburbs bounding the grassland/suburban interface. Small trailers with equipment are placed within suburbs, and the local members rehearse first-aid firefighting regularly before and during the fire season to provide a first response to local issues. Currently, CFUs are the jurisdiction of ACT Fire and Rescue.

=== Historic Brigades ===
Over time, several brigades have been disbanded or absorbed into others, including the Mount Stromlo Observatory brigade, ACT Forests and ACT RFS HQ Brigade. In 1994, at the time of the last major restructure, there were 14 bushfire brigades in the Rural Fire Service with 12 in the ACT and 2 at Jervis Bay Territory. The 12 brigades in the ACT were made up of 6 departmental and 6 volunteer brigades. The 2 brigades at Jervis Bay included 1 departmental and 1 volunteer brigade. The brigades in Jervis Bay transferred to NSW in 2001. Occasionally these are mentioned in reports about fires or pictures in which their call-signs can be seen on the side of the tankers.

Historic Brigades of the ACT
Brigade	Type	Area	Notes
Athllon	Departmental	Woden Valley	Absorbed into Parks Brigade
Kambah	Volunteer	Kambah	Merged to create Uriarra-Stromlo-Central South and Fairlight Brigade
Uriarra-Stromlo-Central South and Fairlight	Volunteer	Western ACT	Predecessor of Rivers Brigade
Woden	Volunteer	Woden Valley	Predecessor of Jerrabomberra Brigade
ACT Forests	Departmental	ACT Forests	Absorbed into Parks Brigade
Headquarters	Volunteer	ACT	Dissolved
Namadgi	Volunteer	Southern ACT	Predecessor of Southern Brigade
Weetangera	Volunteer	Western ACT	Predecessor of Molonglo Brigade
Mulligan's Flat	Volunteer	Northern ACT	Dissolved
Majura Corps	Volunteer	Eastern ACT	Dissolved
Limestone Plains	Volunteer	ACT	Dissolved
Tuggeranong	Volunteer	Southern ACT	Dissolved
Naas	Volunteer	Southern ACT	Dissolved
Tidbinbilla N.R. (Nature Reserve)	Departmental	Tidbinbilla	Absorbed into Parks Brigade
Jervis Bay National Park	Departmental	Jervis Bay Territory	Absorbed by National Parks Wildlife Service
Wreck Bay	Volunteer	Jervis Bay Territory	Transitioned to New South Wales Rural Fire Service

== Structure ==
=== Management of the ACTRFS ===
As a volunteer fire service, the ACTRFS still requires a number of paid staff to undertake vital day-to-day functions and support the needs of the volunteers in Operations.

==== Management (Staff) Structure ====
Overall responsibility for the Rural Fire Service lies with the Chief Officer (CO), who reports directly to the Commissioner – ACT Emergency Services Agency.

Underneath the CO there are a number of staff (paid) roles, whose primary function is to support the volunteer base who constitute the bulk of the workforce and the operational leadership. Currently the CO has four direct reports, who each manage a component of the RFS. Typically, each role will hold the rank of Superintendent. They are;

1. Director – Operations
2. Director – Governance, Planning & Specialised Capability
3. Director – SBPM (Strategic Bushfire Management Plan) Review Project
4. Director – Volunteer Management Team (the VMT is a shared capability between RFS and ACTSES)

==== List of Chief Officers of the ACTRFS ====
- 2020–current Mr Rohan Scott
- 2015–2020 Mr Joe Murphy
- 2009–2015 Mr Andrew Stark

=== Ranks and Insignia ===
The following is used to denote operational rank during operations.

ACTRFS Ranks and Insignia
Rank – Volunteer	Rank – Staff	Qualification	Minimum Years of Service	Helmet Description	Helmet Image	Insignia Description	Epaulette Image
Non-operational	Non-operational	N/A	N/A	N/A	ACTRFS – Firefighter Helmet	"Rural Fire Service" in silver across the bottom of a navy blue epaulette	ACTRFS – RFS Epaulette
Firefighter	N/A	Bush Firefighter	N/A	Lime green	ACTRFS – Firefighter Helmet	"Firefighter" in silver across the bottom of a navy blue epaulette	
Deputy Captain	N/A	ACTRFS Crew Leader	5	Lime green helmet with two red stripes on the apex and "Deputy Captain" written in red on both sides	ACTRFS – Deputy Captain Helmet	One silver bar on the bottom of a navy blue epaulette	ACTRFS – DC Epaulette
Senior Deputy Captain	N/A	ACTRFS Crew Leader	5	Red helmet with two white stripes on the apex and "Senior Deputy Captain" written in white on both sides	ACTRFS – SDC Helmet	Two silver bars on the bottom of a navy blue epaulette	ACTRFS – SDC Epaulette
Captain	N/A	ACTRFS Crew Leader	5	Red helmet with "Captain" written in white on both sides	ACTRFS – Capt Helmet	Three silver bars on the bottom of a navy blue epaulette	ACTRFS – CAPT Epaulette
Group Officer	N/A	ACTRFS Crew Leader plus PUAOPE005A Manage a multi-team Response or PUAOPE016A Manage a multi team sector	Orange helmet with "Group Officer" written in white on both sides		ACTRFS – GO Helmet	Three large silver impellors on a navy blue epaulette	ACTRFS – GO Epaulette
Divisional Commander	Operational Officer	Crew Leader, plus, PUAOPE016A Manage a multi team sector, Diploma of Public Safety (Firefighting Management) or equivalent Diploma as determined by the RFS CO; Or: Relevant associated degree and Level 2 ICS unit of competency or endorsed course/program in Incident Control, Operations, Planning or Logistic		Orange helmet with two white stripes on the apex	ACTRFS – DivCom Helmet	Two large silver impellors on the bottom of a navy blue epaulette	ACTRFS – DivComm Epaulette
N/A	Inspector	Advanced Diploma of Public Safety (Firefighting Management) or equivalent Diploma as determined by the RFS CO; or: Relevant associated degree and Level 3 ICS unit of competency or endorsed course/program in Incident Control, Operations or Planning; or: Refer to Position Description		Orange helmet with "Inspector" written in on both sides	ACTRFS – Inspector Helmet	Large silver and red crown on the bottom of a navy blue epaulette	ACTRFS – Inspector Epaulette
N/A	Superintendent	Advanced Diploma of Public Safety (Firefighting Management) or equivalent Diploma as determined by the RFS CO; or: Relevant associated degree and Level 3 ICS unit of competency or endorsed course/program in Incident Control, Operations; or: Planning or Refer to Position Description		Orange helmet with "Superintendent" written on both sides	ACTRFS – Superintendent Helmet	Small silver impeller, small silver and red crown on the bottom of a navy blue epaulette	ACTRFS – Superintendent Epaulette
N/A	Chief Officer	Refer to Position Description		Black helmet with "Chief Officer" written in white on both sides	ACTRFS – Chief Officer Helmet	Silver wreath, two small silver impeller, small silver and red crown on the bottom of a navy blue epaulette	ACTRFS – Chief Officer Epaulette

==== Non-Rank Insignia ====
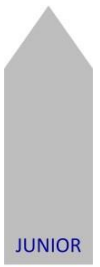
ACTRFS – Junior Epaulette

Junior, or cadet, members are supplied with the same PPE/C as other firefighters, however they wear a different epaulette.

Instructors wear a blue helmet marked with INSTRUCTOR on each side when undertaking instructing or assessing activities.

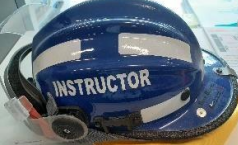
ACTRFS – Instructor Helmet

Fire Investigators wear a blue helmet marked with INVESTIGATOR on each side when undertaking Investigations or fire Investigation activities.

== Operations ==
=== Bush Fire Suppression ===
Under the ACT Emergencies Act 2004, the primary function of the RFS is to "protect and preserve life, property and the environment from fire in rural areas." The rural area is defined by the ACT Government by determining what is the Built Up Area (BUA) and what is Non-Built Up Area (i.e., rural area).

The Act states that to achieve this, the rural fire service is responsible for;

1. operational planning for fire response in rural areas, including fire preparedness; and
2. fire response in rural areas, other than for a fire that is in a building and at which a member of the fire and rescue service is present.

In addition to the primary function, the Act also states the RFS is to provide the following additional functions;

1. (a) to undertake assistance operations to support other entities in the exercise of their functions under this Act;

Example: assisting members of the fire and rescue service at a fire that is in a building in a rural area

(4) The rural fire service may also—

1. (a) respond to a fire in built-up areas; and
2. (b) provide first response to any other incident to which another emergency service may respond under this Act, if the emergency service is unavailable.

=== Regular Non-fire Operations ===
The RFS is involved in a range of other Operations, including hazard reduction burns and community engagement, as well as supporting the ACT State Emergency Service in Storm Damage operations, the Australian Federal Police in Remote Area Land Search and more.

== Training ==
There are two modes of training, one is centralised, common training conducted between all brigades and organised at a territory wide level. Qualifications in this training are achieved and required under the Australian Qualifications Framework. These mainstream Qualifications are standardised between brigades. The mainstream qualifications, in order of attainment are;

1. Bush Firefighter (BF)
2. Village Firefighter (VF)
3. Advanced Firefighter (AF)
4. Crew Leader (CL)
5. Divisional Commander (GL)

The other is the "Weekly Training" held at each brigades shed or within local area. This training will differ from brigade to brigade. Some brigades will have members train one night a week, others once a fortnight. It is often very fluid based on the business of the fire season, or if it is currently in fire season or not.

== Equipment ==
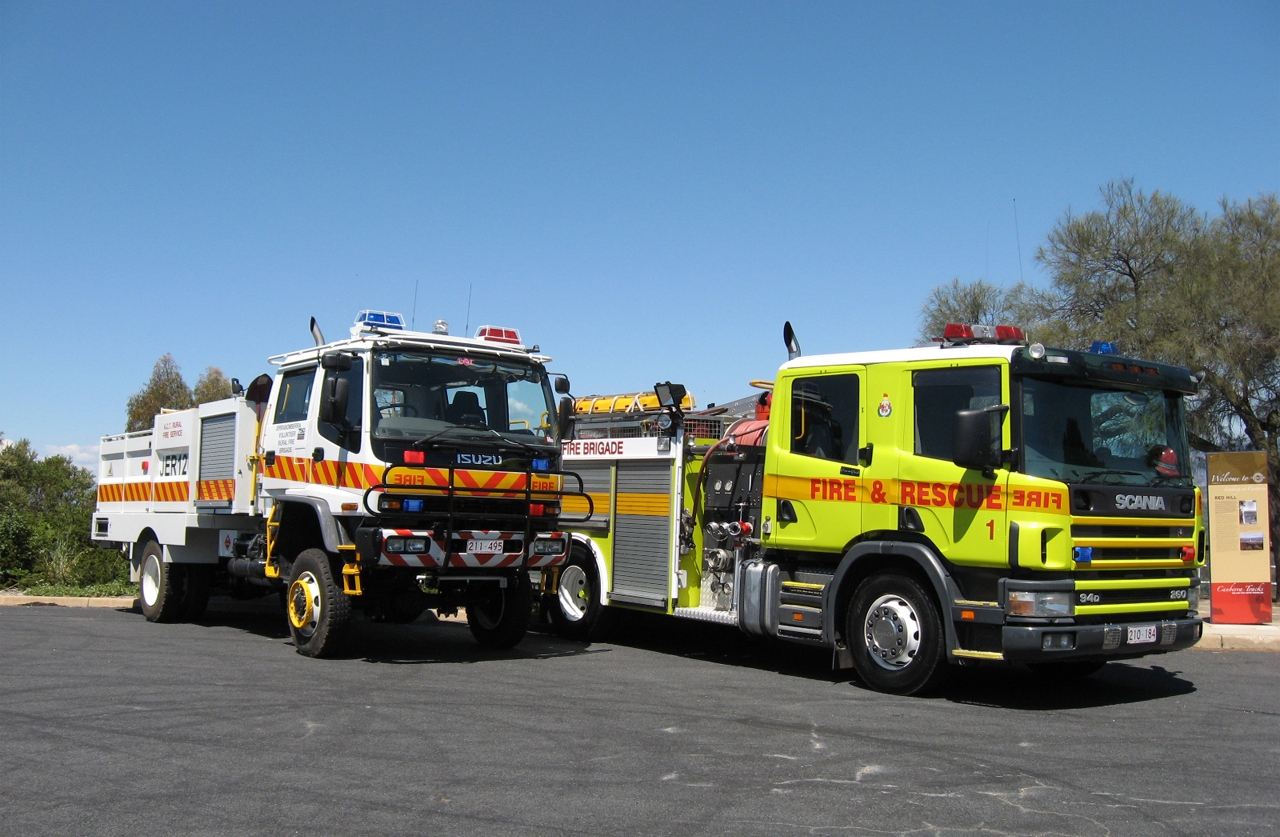
An ACT Rural Fire Service CAFS Isuzu tanker (white) and an ACT Fire Brigade Scania 94D 260 truck (yellow) pumper. Both with "FIRE" in mirror writing ("ERIF").

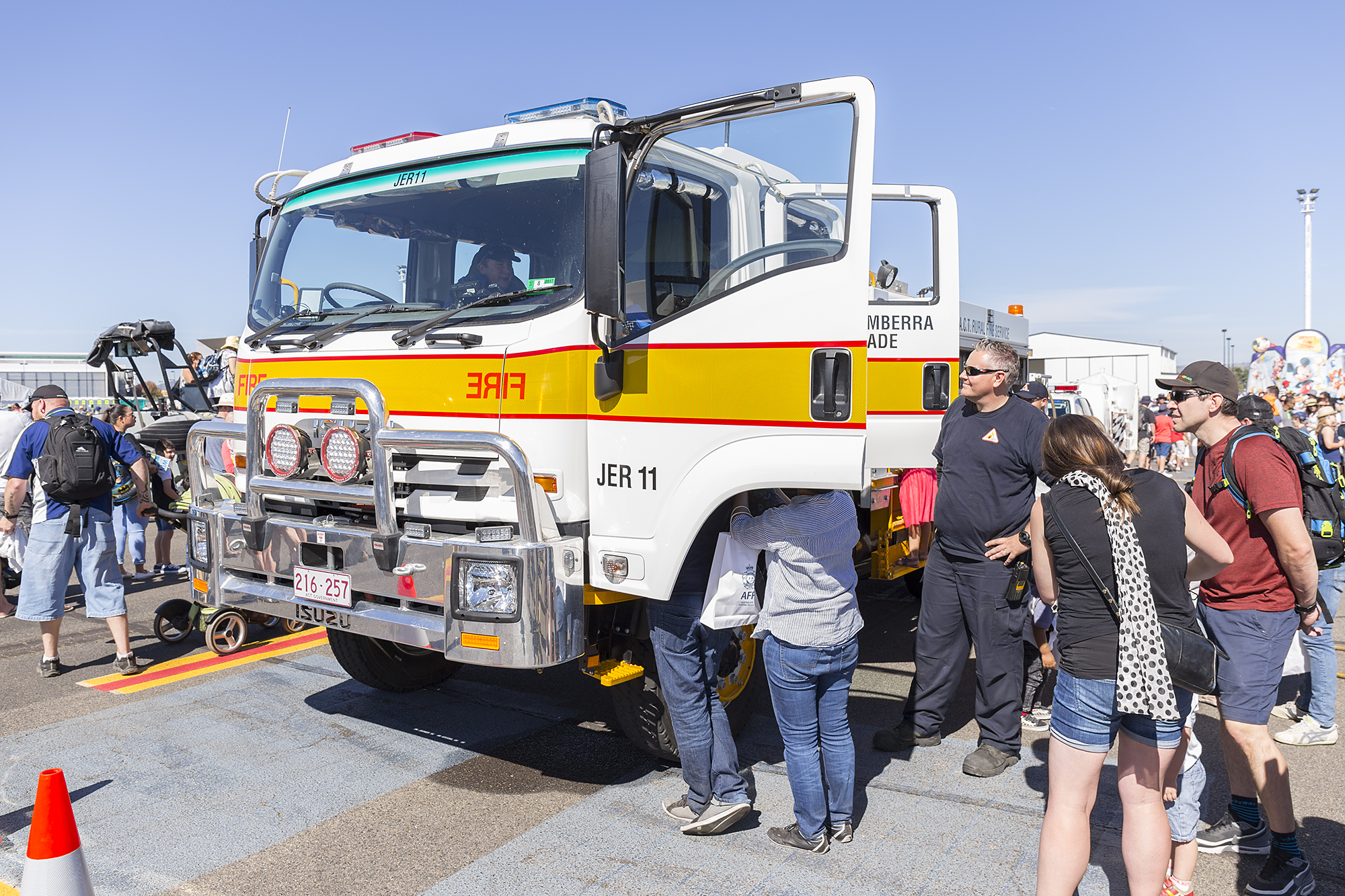
Jerrabomberra 11 tanker

=== Fire Appliances ===
Brigades have various numbers and combinations of the below. The callsign naming convention is; Brigade name or callsign (e.g. TID), followed by a two digit number. The first digit shows the category of the appliance and the second increments with each individual number of that type a brigade holds (e.g., if Tidbinbilla Brigade had two Heavy tankers, they would be identified as TID10 and TID11). The letter "C" is appended after the callsign to indicate CAFS capability. (e.g. MLO10 and MLO11C – the first unit being the first Heavy Tanker of the brigade, and the second being a CAFS capable tanker)

Fire Appliances of the ACT Rural Fire Service
Type	Callsign	Example	Details
Heavy Tanker	"Brigade 1x"	MLO10	Offroad, 4x4 Bushfire tanker. Normally a crew of 5 (twin cab), more rarely crew of three (single cab). Approximately 3,000 litres of water, heavy tankers are the primary frontline firefighting appliance of the ACTRFS. Roughly analogous with the NSWRFS Category 1 Tanker.
Medium Tanker	"Brigade 3x"	RIV30	Offroad, 4x4 Bushfire Tanker. Mostly crew of three (single cab). Approximately 1500 litres of water. Medium tankers are primarily used to access into areas where Heavy Tankers are unable to be taken, such as mountainous terrain. Roughly analogous with the NSWRFS Category 7 Tanker.
Light Unity	"Southern 2x"	SOU20	Offroad, 4x4 bushfire "Slip-On" or "Fast Attack" unit. Single cab appliances built on a ute chassis, with normally 500–900 litres of water. Primarily used for mopping up, or supporting hand-crews in remote and rugged terrain. Roughly analogous with the NSWRFS Category 9 Tanker.
Command Unit	"Brigade Command"	GUNCMD	Either a Ute or Sedan based 4x4 vehicle, designed primarily for use by Field Officers in Command and Control functions, but may also be used to facilitate crew movements or for other support functions.
CAFS Tanker	As unit type, with "C" appended to end	HAL12C	A tanker of given type (Heavy or Medium) with CAFS capability.
Bulk Water	Rivers 19 Bulk Water 19 Bulk Water 20	RIV19, BW19, BW20	The ACTRFS has three Bulk Water appliances. These are non-offroad, non-firefighting appliances for the support of other operations.
Support Trailer	"Brigade 4x"	G/CK40	Vary. May be specific quick-fill trailer with a single built in pump, designed to be parked near a dam to allow for quick filling of units, a trailer carrying a range of portable pumps or a RAFT trailer with the equipment cache required by a RAFT team.

== Communications ==
E000 calls are taken by ACT Fire and Rescue operators who also dispatch RFS Brigades. Once a brigade has been activated, the call-out is arranged by Brigades, using mobile phone text messages, emails and the newly adopted AVAR system.

Communications are coordinated with the ACT Emergency Services Agency and New South Wales Rural Fire Service.

== See also ==
- 2003 Canberra bushfires
- ACT Fire and Rescue
- Bushfires in the Australian Capital Territory
