= Peter Dunn (general) =

Australian general

Peter James Dunn

Australian Capital Territory Emergency Services Agency Commissioner
- In office 2004–2006
- Preceded by: Inaugural appointment
- Succeeded by: Gregor Manson

Personal details
- Born: 14 April 1947 (age 79) Ballarat, Victoria

Military service
- Allegiance: Australia
- Branch/service: Australian Army
- Years of service: 1965–2002
- Rank: Major General
- Commands: 1st Brigade
- Battles/wars: Vietnam War
- Awards: Officer of the Order of Australia; Mentioned in Despatches

Major General Peter James Dunn AO (born 14 April 1947) is a retired senior officer in the Australian Army, and a former Commissioner for the Australian Capital Territory Emergency Services Authority (2004–2006).

As Commissioner for the Australian Capital Territory Emergency Services Authority he was responsible for the ACT Fire Brigade, ACT Ambulance Service, Rural Fire Service and State Emergency Service. He was appointed to this position in 2003 by Chief Minister Jon Stanhope. The creation of this position was recommended by the McLeod Inquiry into the Canberra bushfires of 2003.

Dunn was previously a major general in the Australian Army. While serving in the army, he had completed a Defence Efficiency Review of the Australian Defence Force in 1997, and a forward plan for the Army in the 21st Century.
