= ACT Fire and Rescue =

Urban fire and rescue service for the Australian Capital Territory

A.C.T. Fire and Rescue
- ACT Fire Brigade Emblem

Agency overview
- Formed: 1913
- Jurisdiction: Government of the Australian Capital Territory
- Employees: 330
- Agency executive: Mr Matthew Mavity, Chief Officer
- Parent agency: ACT Emergency Services Agency
- Website: www.esa.act.gov.au/actfr

The ACT Fire and Rescue previously known as ACT Fire Brigade. Is the urban Fire and Rescue service for the Australian Capital Territory. Along with the ACT Ambulance Service, ACT State Emergency Service and ACT Rural Fire Service they form part of the Australian Capital Territory Emergency Services Agency (formerly the ACT Emergency Services Authority).

By 2011 the ACT Fire and Rescue maintained nine stations with more than 330 staff operating 34 apparatus.

== Fire Stations/Apparatus ==
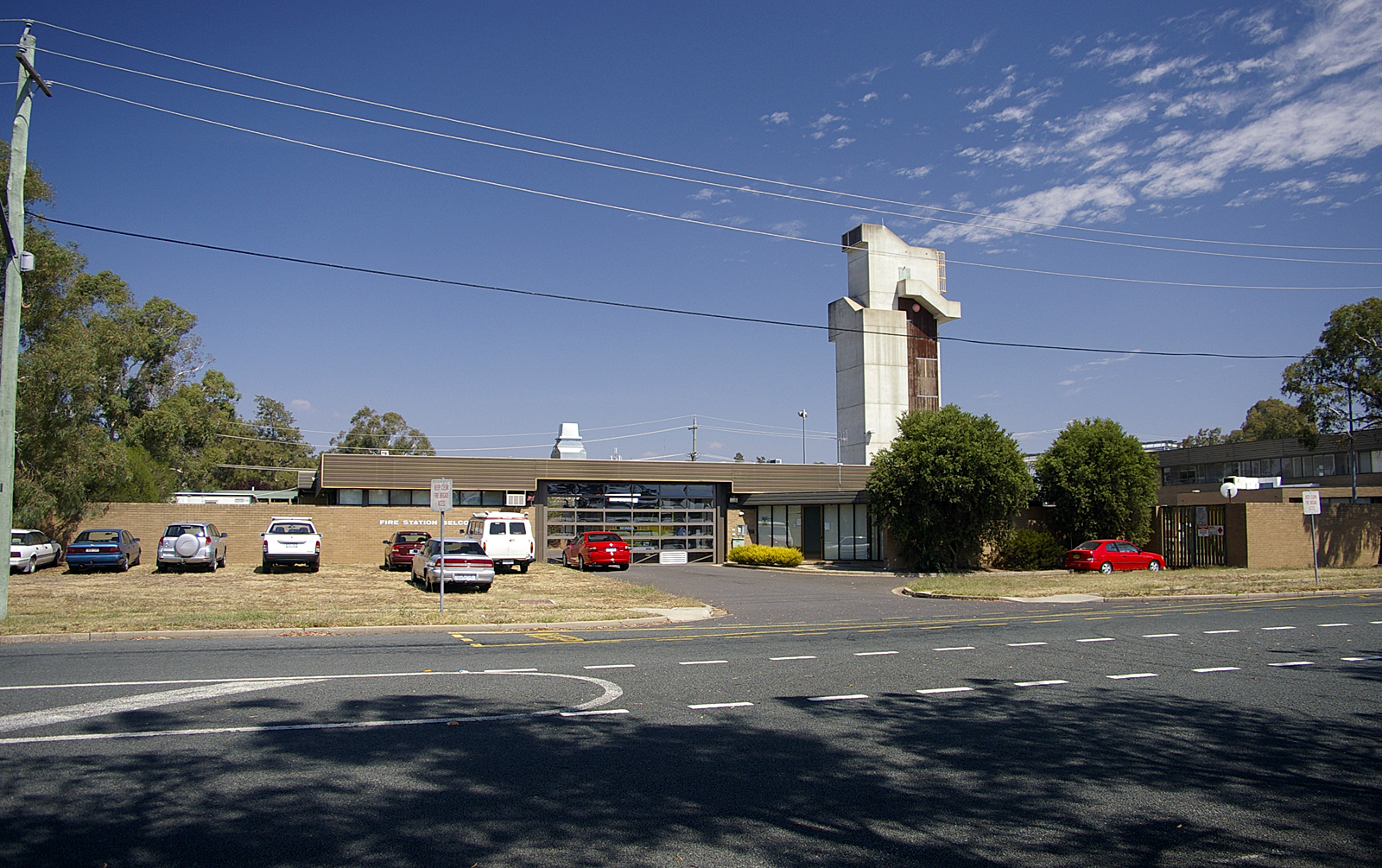
The former Belconnen Fire Station, which operated until 2016.

Station #	Station Name	Address	Apparatus
1	Fyshwick	1 Dalby St, Fyshwick ACT 2609	P1, WT13, HAZ20, L35, T40, T41
2	Ainslie	34 Wakefield Ave, Ainslie ACT 2602	P2, BA27
3	Phillip	37 Altree Ct, Phillip ACT 2606	RP3
4	Belconnen/ Aranda	Bardi Pl, Macquarie ACT 2614	RP4, A31
5	Kambah	500 Sulwood Dr, Kambah ACT 2902	P5, LU51, WT53
6	West Belconnen/ Charnwood	Lhotsky St, Charnwood ACT 2615	P6, LU61, WT63
7	Chisholm	6 Benham St, Chisholm ACT 2905	RP7, R48, R49
8	South Tuggeranong	Tharwa Dr, Conder ACT 2906	P8, C82, C88
9	Gungahlin	31 Anthony Rolfe Ave, Gungahlin ACT 2912	P9, C92, C98

== Fire apparatus glossary/(callsigns) ==
- Pumper: (P1/P2/P5/P6/P8/P9)
- Heavy Rescue Pumper: (RP3/RP4/RP7)
- Hazmat Response Vehicle: (HAZ20)
- Breathing Apparatus Support Vehicle: (BA27)
- Rosenbauer B42 Platform: (A30)
- Logistics Vehicle: (B35)
- Platform on Demand Truck: (T40/T41)
- Vertical Rescue Vehicle: (R48)
- Remote Area Road Rescue Vehicle: (R49)
- CAFS Light Tanker: C82/C92
- CAFS Heavy Tanker: C88/C98
- Commander: (CMDR1/CMDR2/CMDR3)
- Confined Space Rescue Trailer (CSRtr)
- Bobcat (T190)
- Light Brush Tanker: (LU51/LU61)
- Heavy Tanker (W13/W53/W63)

Pods:

- Breathing Apparatus Support (BAS)
- Breathing Apparatus Accountability & Command (CMD)
- General Purpose (GP)
- Mass Decontamination Support (MDS)
- Rapid Decontamination Support (RDS)
- Rehabilitation (RHB)
- Salvage & Ventilation (S/V)
- Technical Rescue Support (TRS)
- Tilt Tray (TT)
- Urban Search & Rescue 1 (USAR1)
- Urban Search & Rescue 2 (USAR2)
- Welfare Support (WFS)
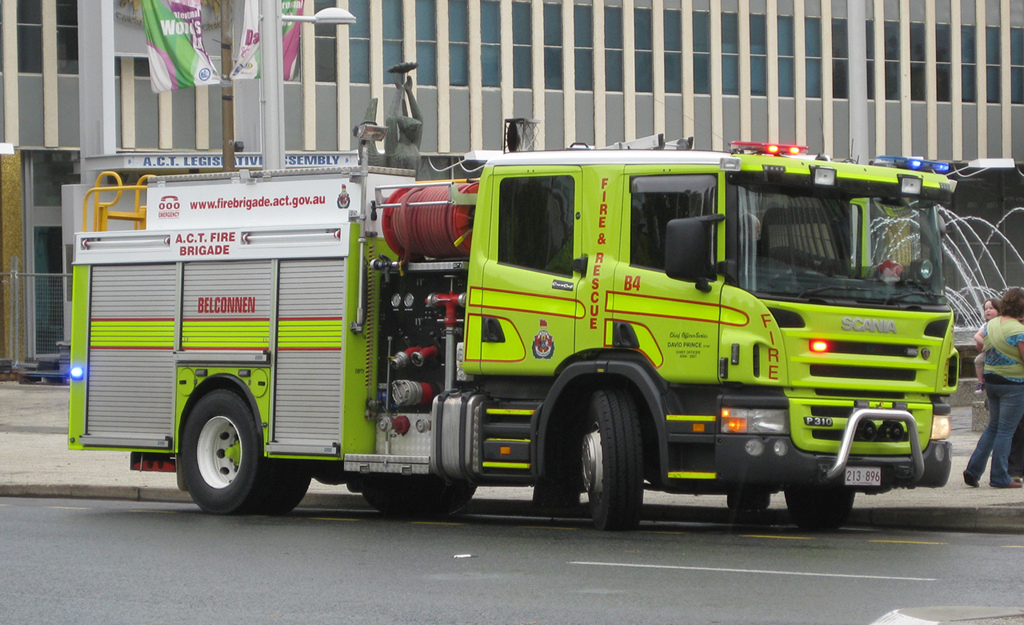
Heavy Rescue Pumper – B4

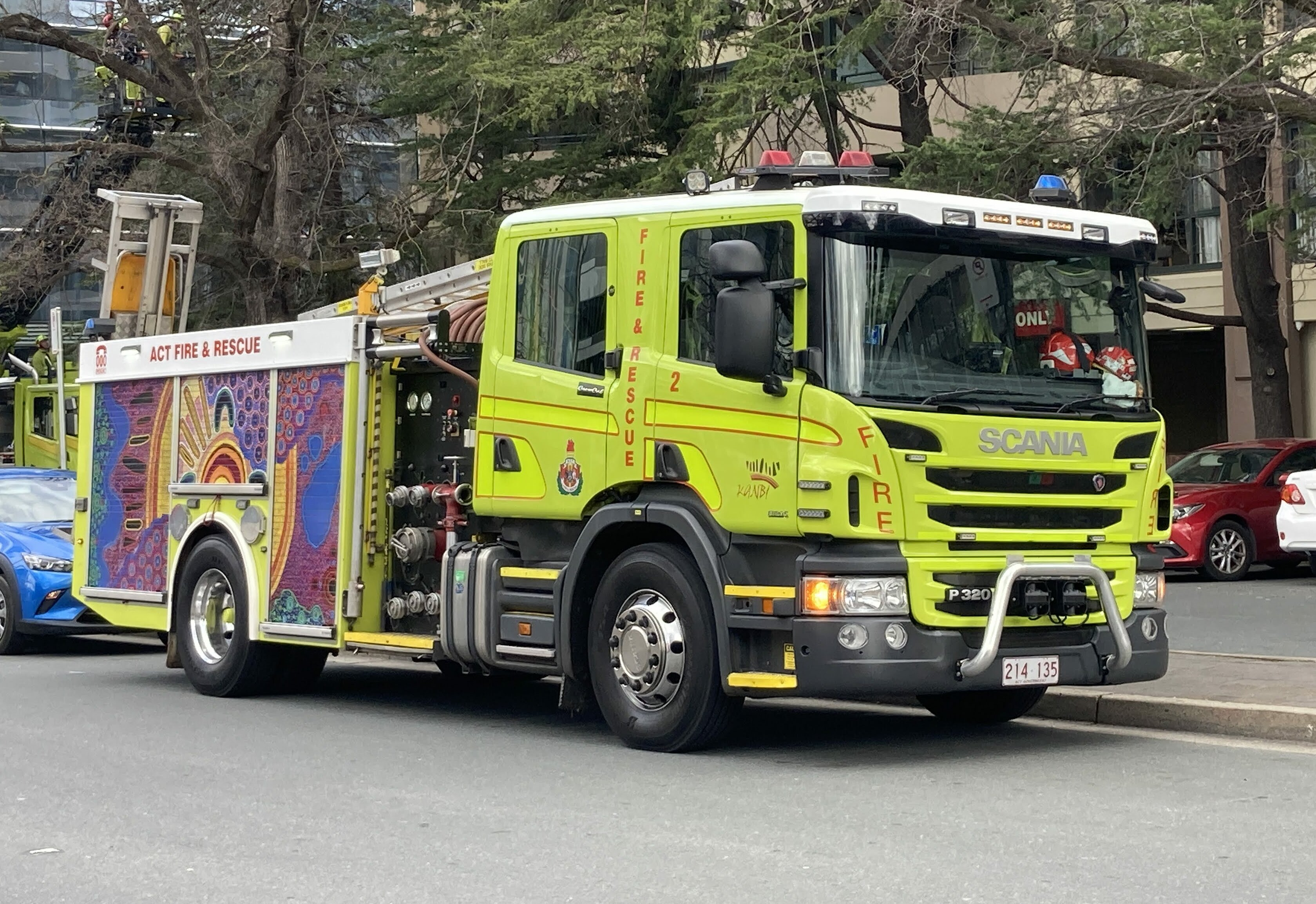
Scania P320 Heavy Pumper

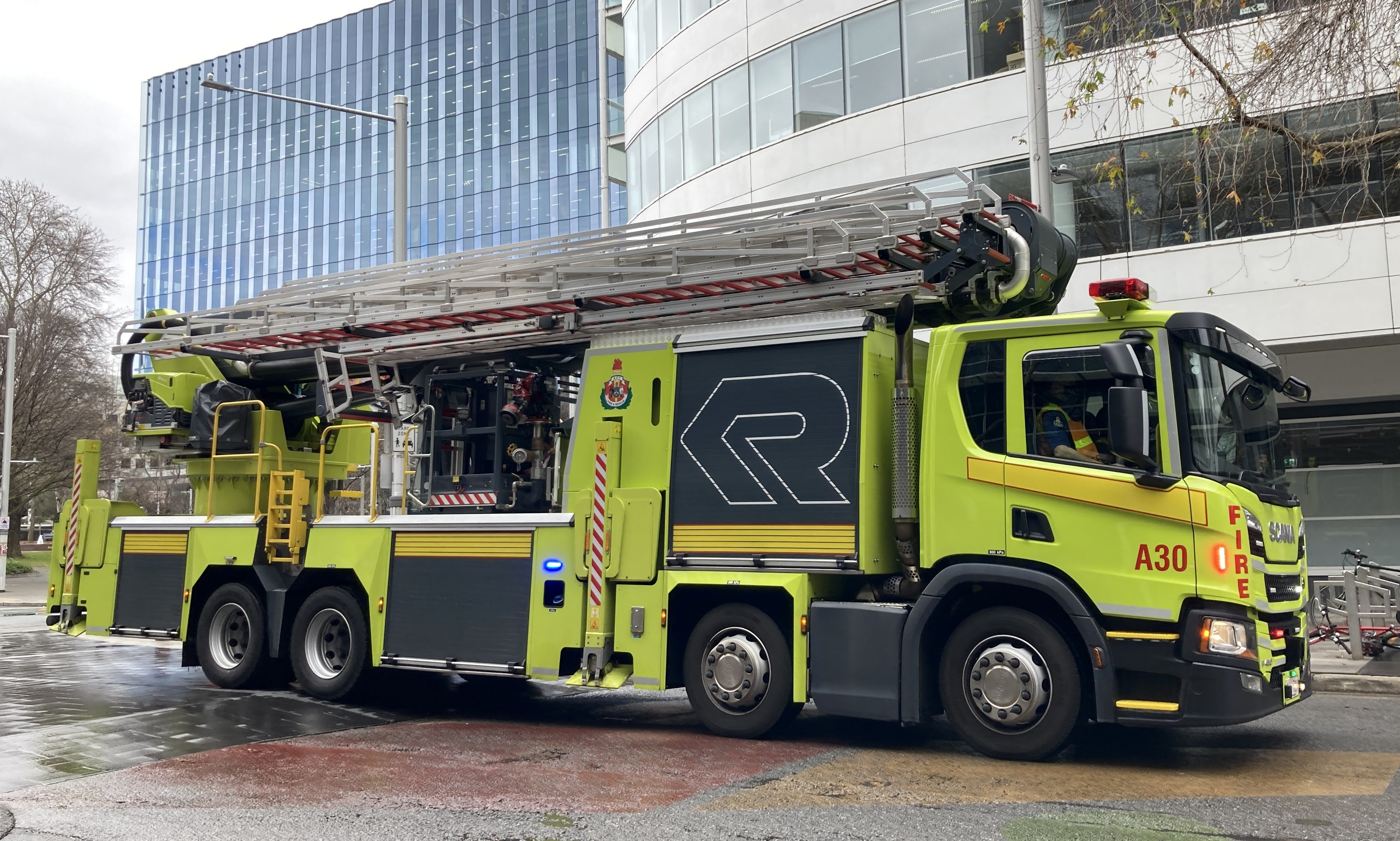
Scania appliance with a Rosenbauer Hydraulic Platform

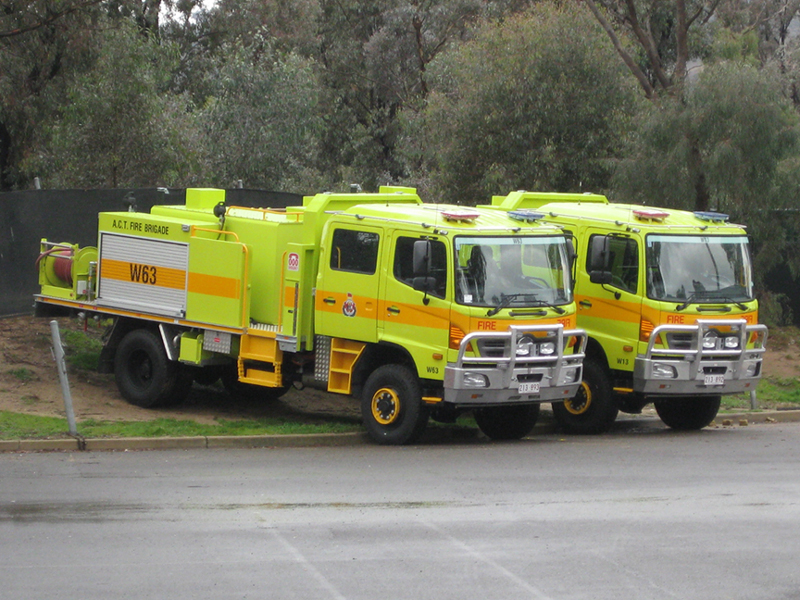
Hino Heavy Tankers

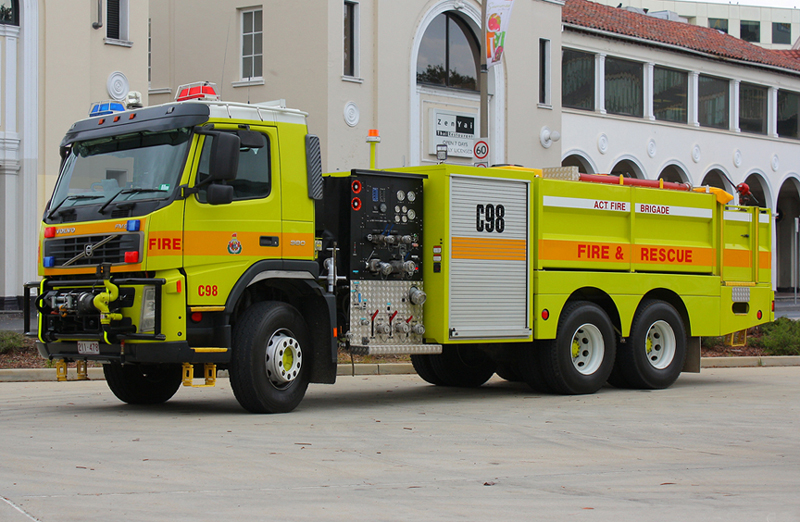
Volvo FM9 CAFS Tanker – C70

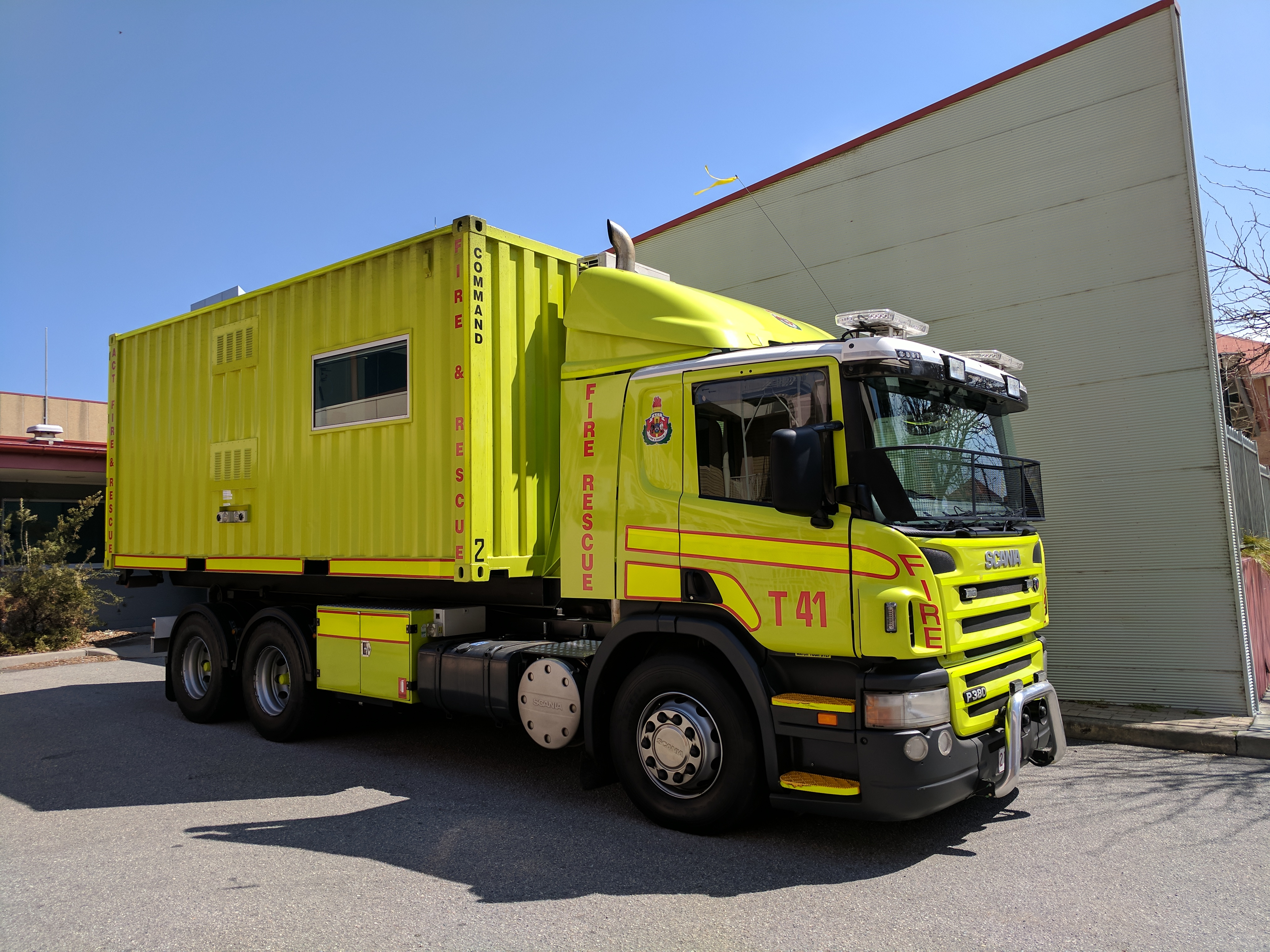
Scania P 380 Pod truck

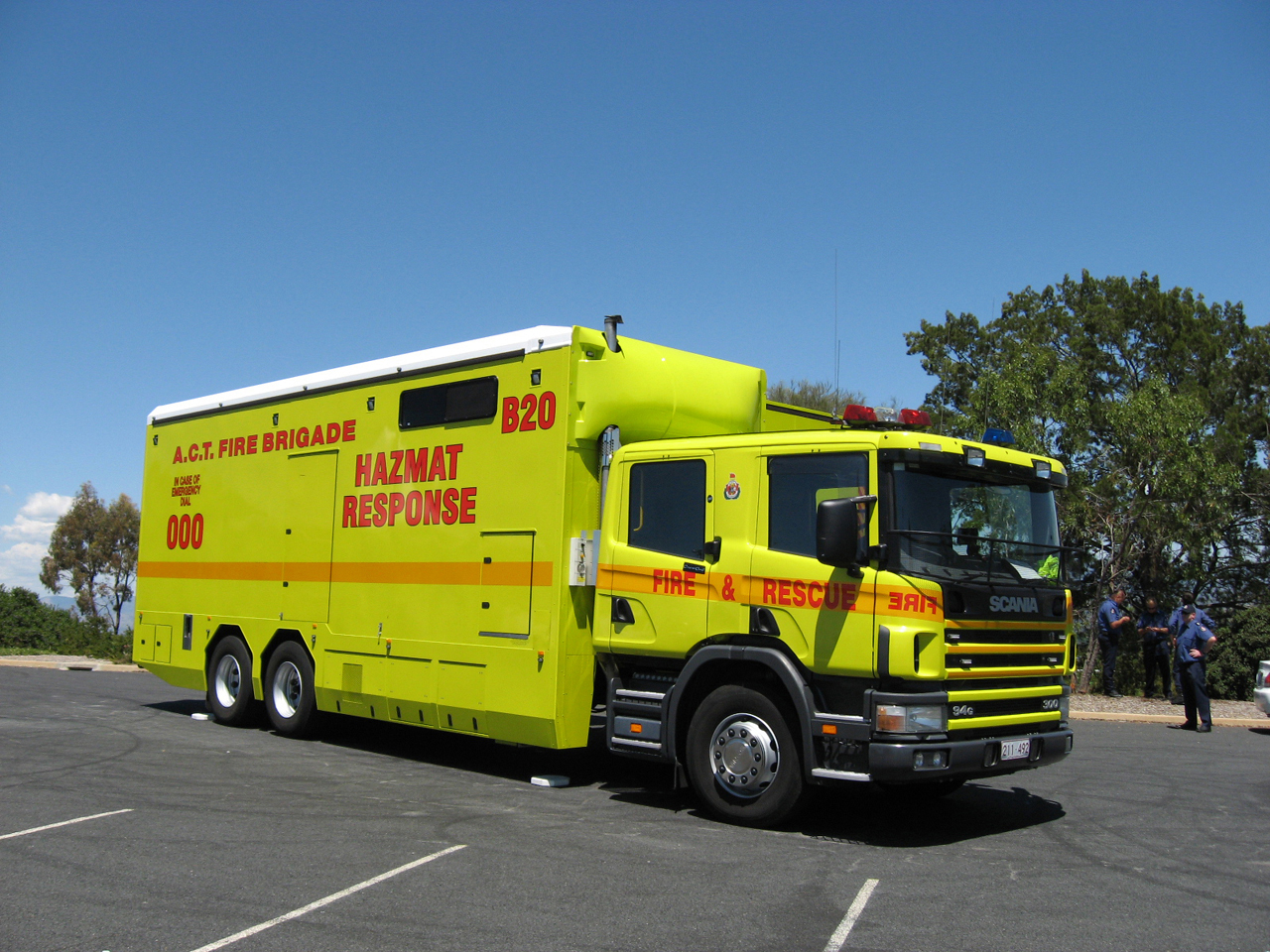
HazMat Response

== See also ==
- Australian Capital Territory Rural Fire Service
- Australian Capital Territory Emergency Services Agency
