= Australian Capital Territory Emergency Services Agency =

Australian government agency

A.C.T. Emergency Services Agency

Agency overview
- Formed: 2004
- Jurisdiction: Government of the Australian Capital Territory
- Annual budget: A$231m (2024–25)
- Agency executives: Wayne Phillips, Commissioner; Glenn Brewer, Assistant Commissioner (Capability); Megan Davis, Assistant Commissioner (Corporate); Kaylee Rutland, Interim Assistant Commissioner (Collaboration); David Dutton, Chief Officer, ACT Ambulance Service; Peter Cleary, Chief Officer, ACT Fire and Rescue; Rohan Scott, Chief Officer, ACT Rural Fire Service; Steve Forbes, Chief Officer, ACT State Emergency Service
- Parent agency: Justice and Community Safety Directorate
- Child agencies: ACT Ambulance Service; ACT Fire and Rescue; ACT Rural Fire Service; ACT State Emergency Service
- Website: www.esa.act.gov.au

The Australian Capital Territory Emergency Services Agency (ACT ESA) was established by the Emergencies Act 2004 (ACT), which came into effect on 1 July 2004. The mission of the ACT ESA is to protect and preserve life, property and the environment in the ACT.

The ACT Emergency Services Agency (ESA) is the ACT Government organisation charged with providing emergency management services to the Canberra community. The ESA Mission is “We work together to care and protect through cohesive operations, collaborative management and a unified executive”.

The ESA workforce profile includes over 2500 full time and volunteer personnel.

== Structure ==
The Commissioner, ESA reports to Director-General of the Justice & Community Safety Directorate (JACS), who is responsible to the Minister for Police and Emergency Services. The ACT ESA comprises: four emergency service agencies and several support areas, including: People and Culture, Governance and Logistics, Risk & Planning Services, Emergency Media and Broadcasting Services. The four operational agencies are:

- ACT Ambulance Service
- ACT Fire & Rescue
- ACT Rural Fire Service
- ACT State Emergency Service

== Commissioners ==
- 2003–2006 Peter Dunn AO
- 2006–2009 Gregor Manson
- 2009 David Foot ASM (Acting)
- 2010–2013 Mark Crosweller AFSM
- 2013–2019 Dominic Lane AFSM
- 2019–2023 Georgeina Whelan AM, CSC and Bar
- 2024–current Wayne Phillips

== Budget ==
Year	Total Cost
2024/25	A$231.266m
2023/24	A$217.601m
2022/23	A$203m
2019/20	A$161.279m
2018/19	A$147.924m
2017/18	A$141.531m
2016/17	A$143.929m
2008/09	A$66.794m
2007/08	A$60.421m
2006/07	A$59.157m
2005/06	A$53.495m
2004/05	A$44.813m

== History ==
=== 1993–2004: Emergency Services Bureau ===
Prior to 1 July 2004, emergency services in the ACT were delivered by the Emergency Services Bureau, an agency of the ACT Department of Justice and Community Safety.

=== 2004–2006: Emergency Services Authority ===
The Emergencies Act 2004 (ACT) established the ESA as a statutory authority.

=== 2006–present: Emergency Services Agency ===
In the 2006–07 Australian Capital Territory budget, the ACT Government announced that the ESA would again be subsumed by the ACT Department of Justice and Community Safety, effective 1 July 2006.

== See also ==
- ACT Ambulance Service
- ACT Rural Fire Service
- ACT Fire & Rescue
- Gregor Manson, former ESA Commissioner
- Peter Dunn, former ESA Commissioner
- National Council for Fire & Emergency Services
