= Australian Capital Territory Ambulance Service =

A.C.T. Ambulance Service
- ACT Ambulance Service logo

Agency overview
- Jurisdiction: Government of the Australian Capital Territory
- Employees: ~400
- Agency executive: Mr David Dutton, Chief Officer
- Parent agency: ACT Emergency Services Agency

The Australian Capital Territory Ambulance Service (ACTAS) is responsible for providing emergency and non-emergency ambulance services to the ACT community. Although existing since 1955 it was established in legislation by the Emergencies Act 2004 (ACT).

In 2005 ACTAS celebrated its 50th anniversary of service to the ACT community. In 1955 the Canberra Ambulance Service was formally established as a separate entity and is the predecessor to the organisation that exists today. From 1935 to 1955 the provision of ambulance services was done by members of the Fire Service. Prior to that volunteer drivers from the Transport Section of the Department of the Interior drove the ambulance, a Model "T" Ford.

== History ==
=== 1913–1935: Volunteers from the Transport Section, Department of the Interior ===
Medical Officer for the Federal Capital Territory, Dr R M Thomson trained volunteers from work camps in basic first aid. A vehicle from Transport Section was provided when required to transport sick or injured workmen. The ambulance service in Canberra in the 1920s comprised a sole ambulance vehicle, a "T" model Ford, which was stored in the timber yard adjacent to the Kingston Power House.

=== 1935–1955: The Canberra Fire & Ambulance Service ===
In 1935 the Ambulance Service was amalgamated with the newly formed Fire Service and continued to be based at the transport section at Kingston. The Canberra Fire & Ambulance Service was administered by the Department of the Interior. Fire officers who held first aid certificates could be rostered for ambulance duties, for which they donned white dust coats and changed caps and were paid an additional allowance (five shillings).

After formation of the Hospital Board in November 1935 the Ambulance Service was placed under the Board's administration, although remained located with the Fire Brigade. The Board conferred on Mr P. F. Douglas the designation of Chief Ambulance Officer.

In 1939 the combined service transferred to the new Fire Station in Empire Circuit, Forrest, close to the Manuka Football Club.

The Hospital Board resolved in November 1942 (during the war years) that ambulance vehicles would not be permitted to undertake long trips outside the Territory.

In 1955 Mr C. Holdom was appointed as the new fire chief, and he objected strongly to the Secretary of the Department of the Interior about having to carry out ambulance duties.

=== 1955–1968: The Canberra Ambulance Service ===
On 10 October 1955 the Canberra Ambulance Service was established as a separate organisation with a staff of seven, consisting of a Superintendent and six ambulance officers. The original seven members of the service were:

- Superintendent Alf Grant
- M. Anderson
- N. Webster
- M. Bradley
- J. Blomfield
- G. Leach
- G. Harris

The commencing salary of an ambulance officer in 1955 was £738.00 per annum (£14.0.9 per week). The Superintendent was given free housing, fuel, light, power and a telephone and officers could get accommodation at the Acton Guest House for £5.0.6 per week.

The service operated from an ex-fireman's house at 27 Manuka Circle, from where officers had to run 50 yards down a lane to the fire station to get their vehicles. Ambulances in use at the time consisted of two Humber Super Snipes and a Buick and were considered fully equipped with their carry stretcher, oxygen bottle and mask, splints and bandages.

In the early 1960s it was reported that the Ambulance Service also provided services within the hospital, including the transport of patients from ward to ward or from ward to hospital department. Officers also undertook administrative duties during quiet periods, including courier duties to/from the blood bank, railway station, airways and post office.

The ambulance fleet consisted of four specific ambulance wagons, which were equipped with two-way radio equipment. Staffing had increased to: 1 Superintendent, 1 Station Officer and 12 trained ambulance officers.

In July 1967 the first specific purpose ambulance station was built in Griffith. In February 1968 the Ambulance Service was removed from the Royal Canberra Hospital site and from Hospital Board administration and became a unit of ACT Health Services.

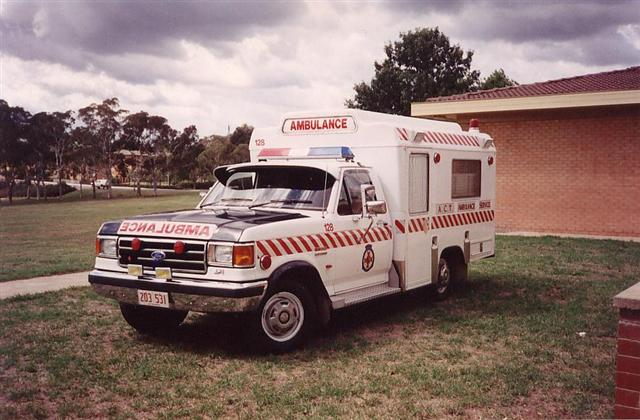
Ford Ambulance in 1996

=== 1968–1985: The ACT Ambulance Service ===
On 15 February 1968, the service came under the ACT Health Services and moved into a new headquarters at Dickson. It was at this time that the service became known as the ACT Ambulance Service (ACTAS).

As Canberra grew, new stations were opened in Phillip (1970) and Belconnen (1973).

In 1985 the ACT Ambulance Service had 56 staff (including 1 Superintendent and 10 Station Officers) and a fleet of 12 ambulance vehicles. Ambulance Officers were trained in Advanced Life Support (ALS) skills and drove modular Ford F100 ambulances.

== Ambulance Stations ==
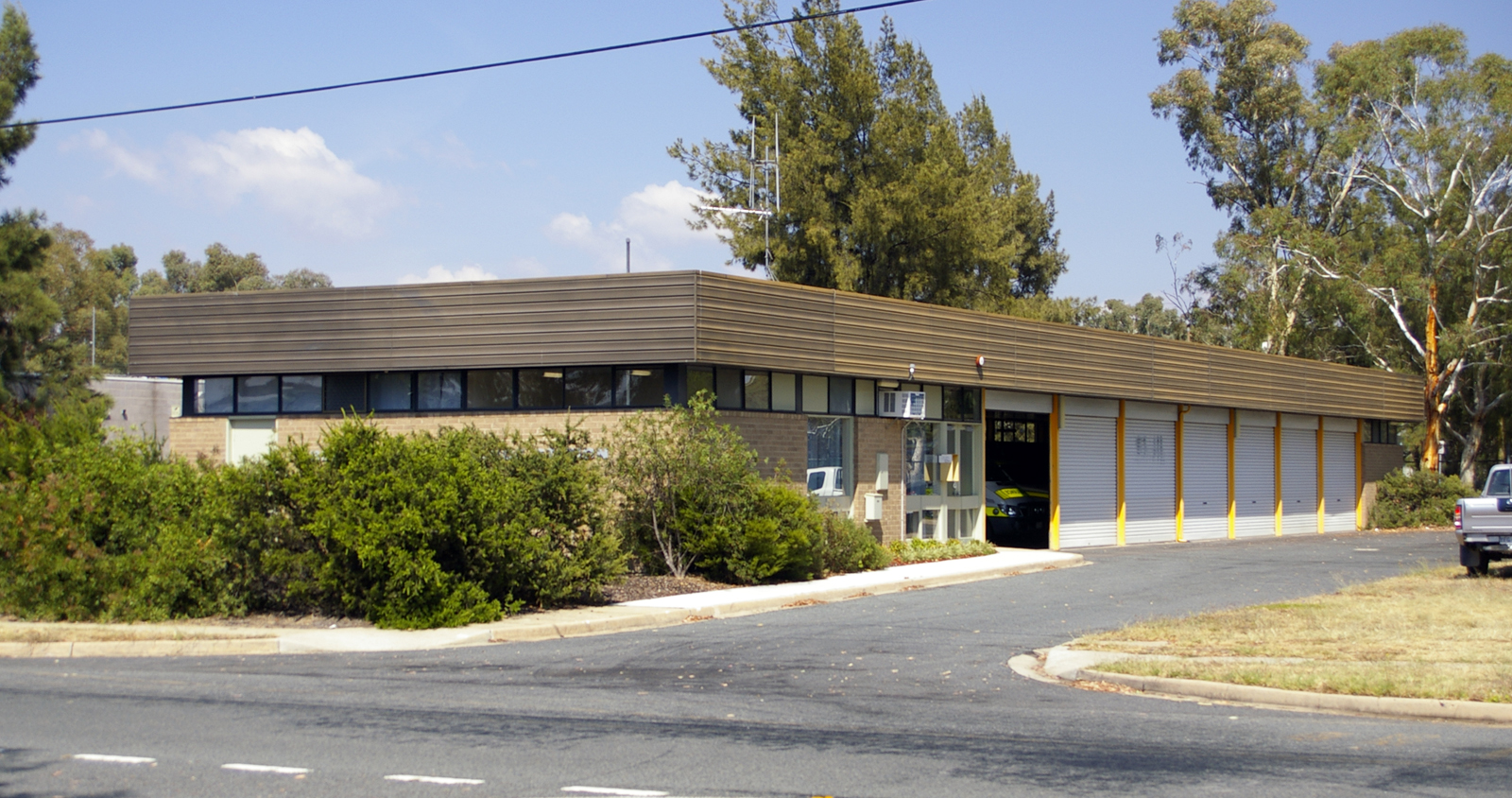
The former Belconnen Ambulance Station, which operated until 2016.

ACT Ambulance Service currently operates out of eight stations throughout Canberra, with future stations under construction in Acton and Molongolo Valley.

Station	Area
Dickson	Challis & Morphett Streets
Belconnen	Bardi Place, Aranda
Woden	Hindmarsh Drive
Calwell	Johnson Drive
Fyshwick	Dalby Street
Gungahlin	Anthony Rolfe Avenue
Greenway	Reed Street
West Belconnen	Lhotsky Street
Acton	Clunies Ross Street
Molongolo (Planned completion in 2026)	Cotter Road

== Ambulance Fleet ==
- Emergency Ambulances

Like most Australian state/territory ambulance services, the ACTAS emergency ambulance fleet is based on the Mercedes Benz Sprinter Van. Previously, GMC and Ford F-250 light truck chassis with a fibreglass module were used.

- Patient Transport Service (PTS)

ACTAS PTS vehicles are also based on the Mercedes Benz Sprinter Van. PTS vehicles are used for non-emergency transport and can be used in dual-stretcher or single stretcher and seated configurations.

- Single Officer Response Units (SRU) & Operational Command Vehicles

ACTAS uses a variety of platforms for Duty Commanders and Single Responding Paramedics, including Hyundai Santa Fe, Holden Colorado, Mitsubishi Challenger and Mitsubishi ASX.

- 4WD Ambulance

ACTAS has two 4WD ambulances. One is based on a 70 series Toyota Landcruiser chassis, while the other is a Y62 Nissan Patrol.

- Complex Patient Vehicle (CPV)

A pair of Sprinter based "box" style ambulances with expanded capabilities, including larger stretchers capable of safety transporting bariatric patients and additional room for critical care equipment.

- Operational Support Unit (OSU)

A larger (416 series) Mercedes Benz van used to provide support at public events and major incidents.

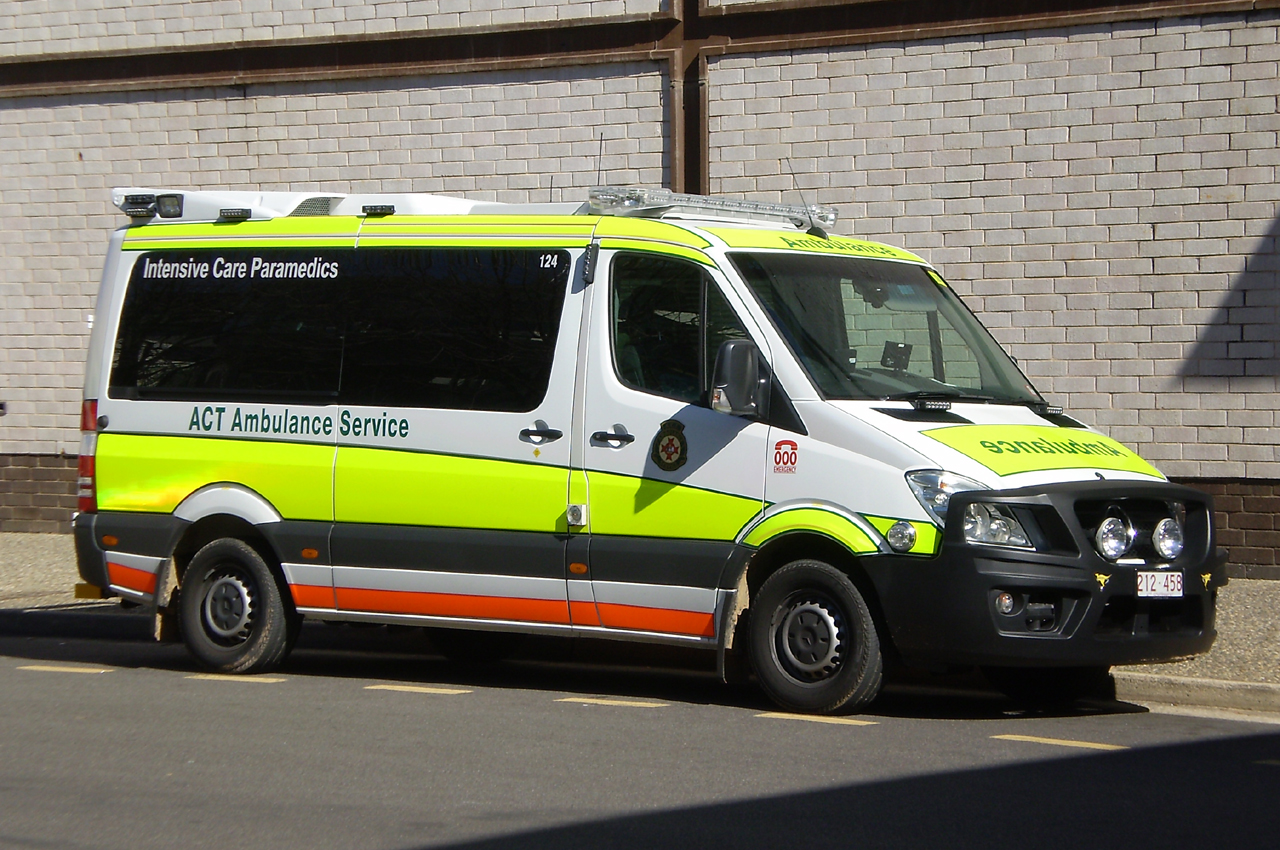
Emergency (Intensive Care) Ambulance

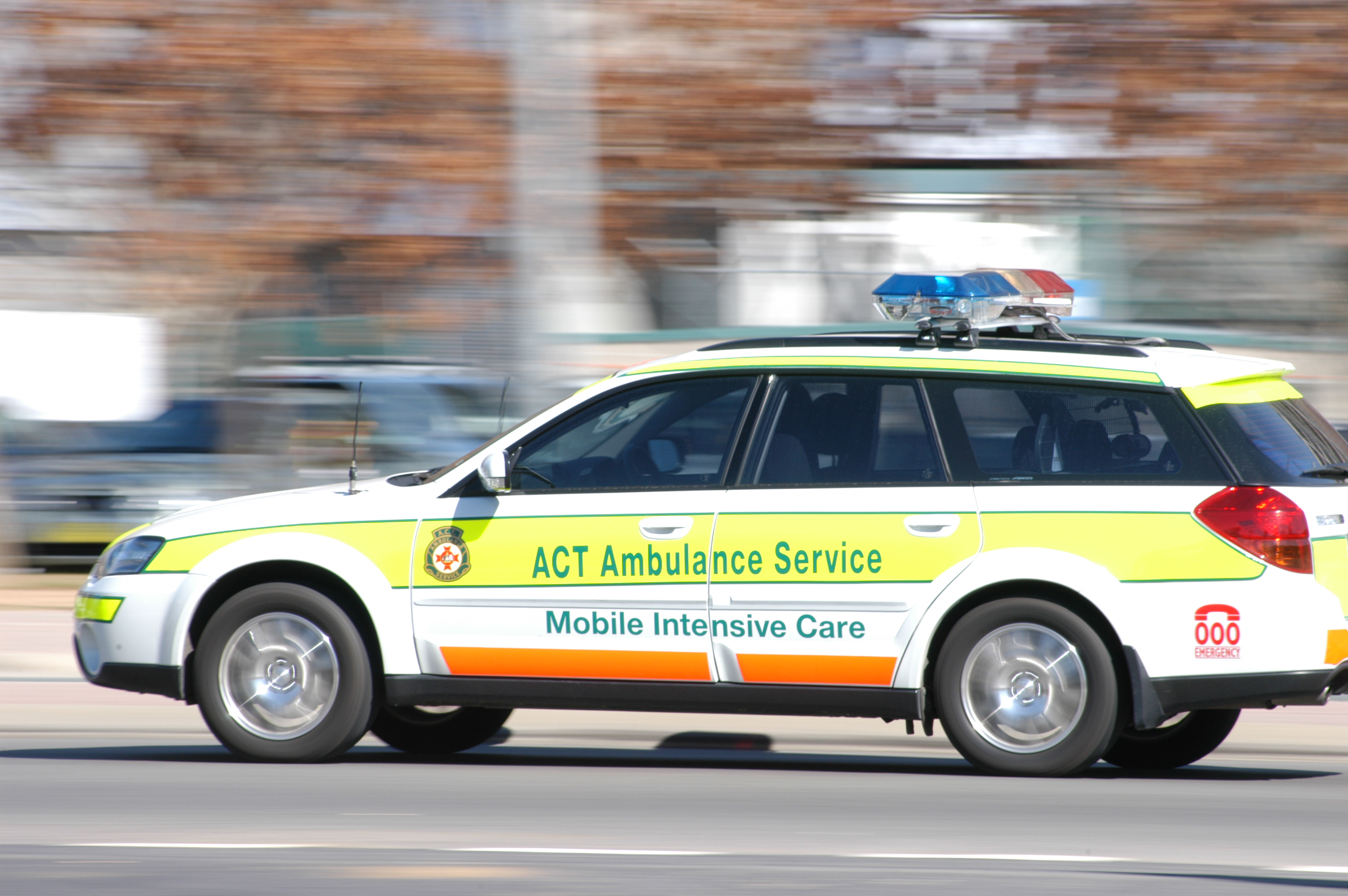
ACTAS rapid response vehicle

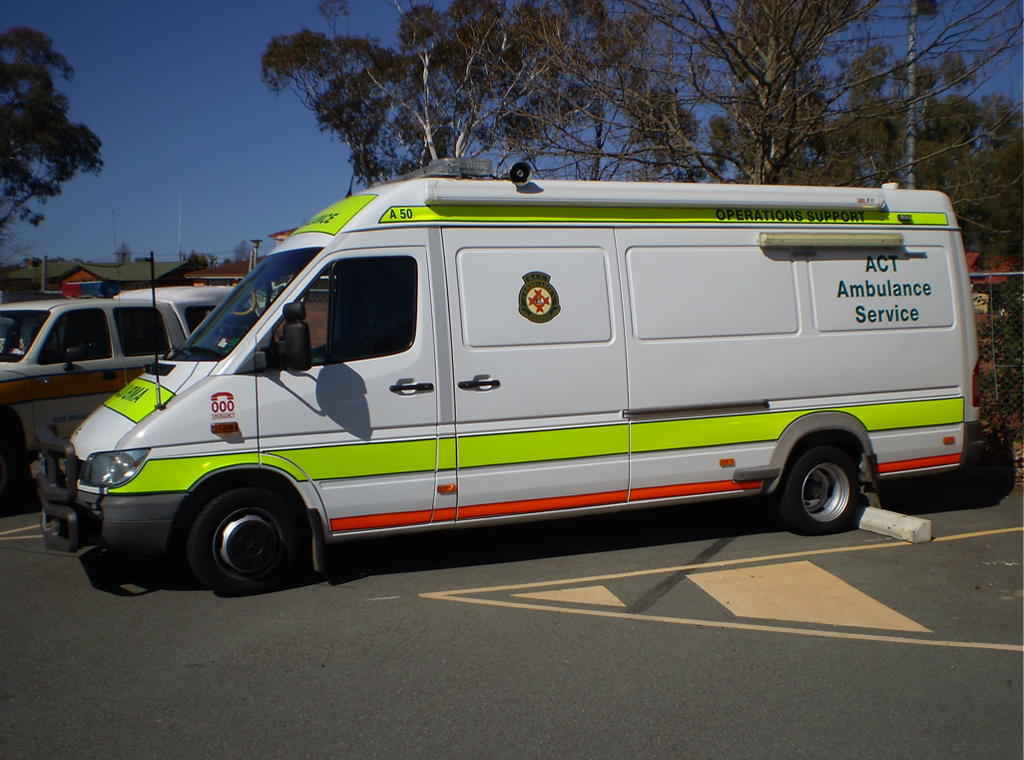
Operational Support Unit

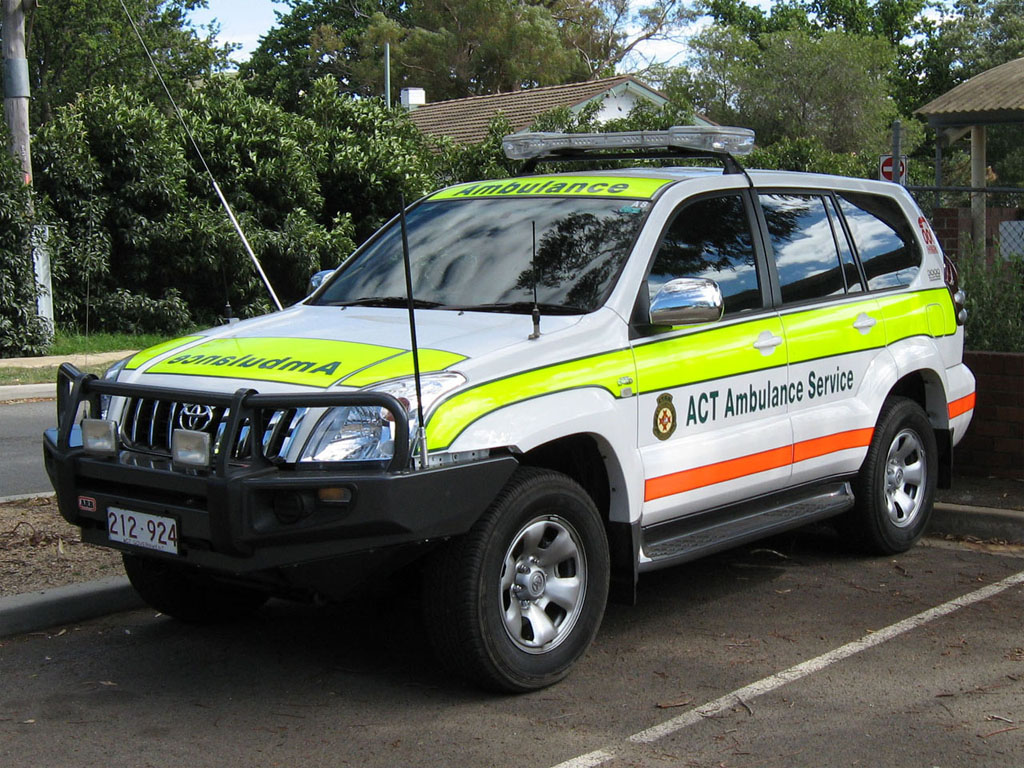
Operational Command vehicle

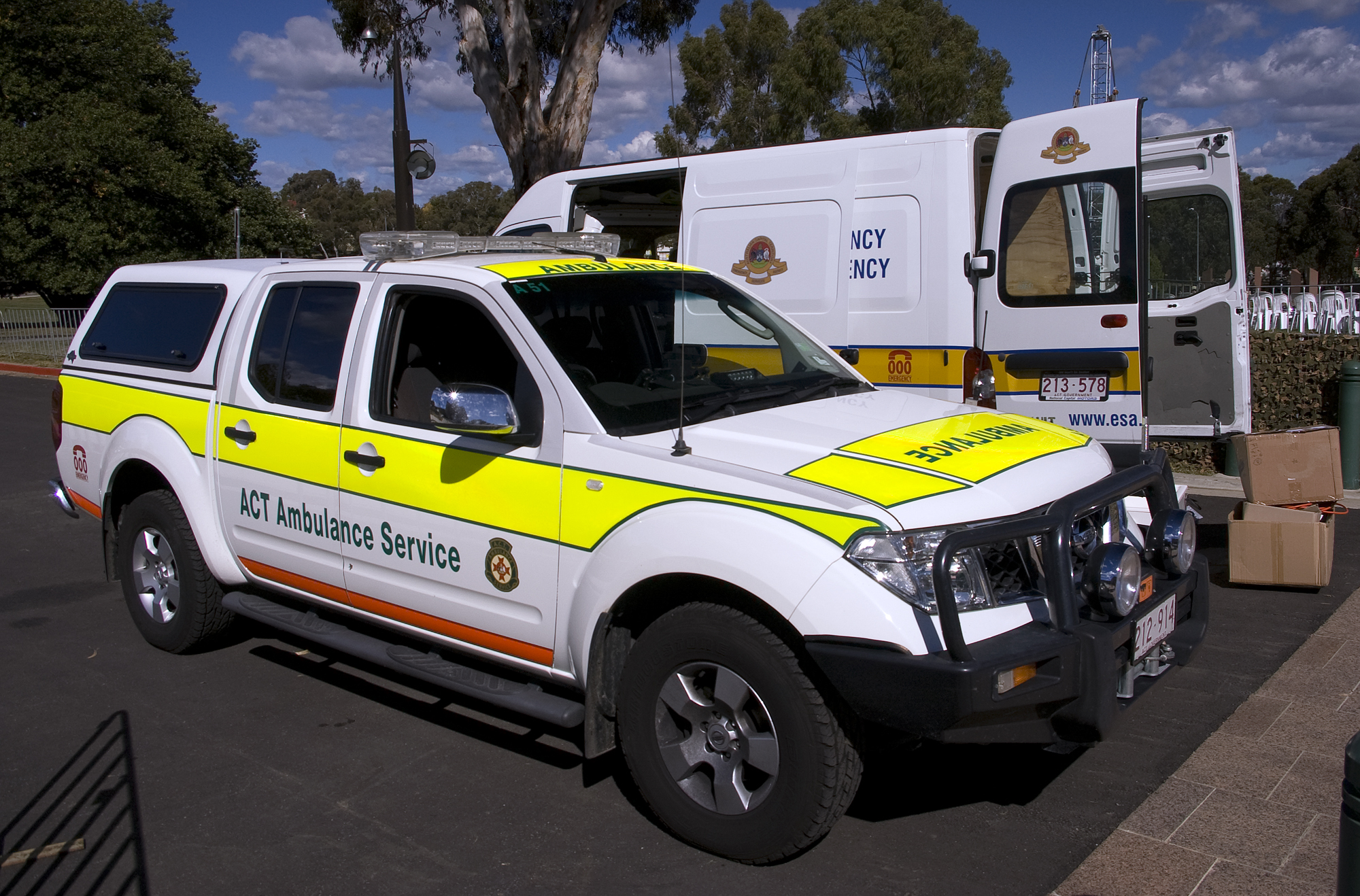
Nissan Navara

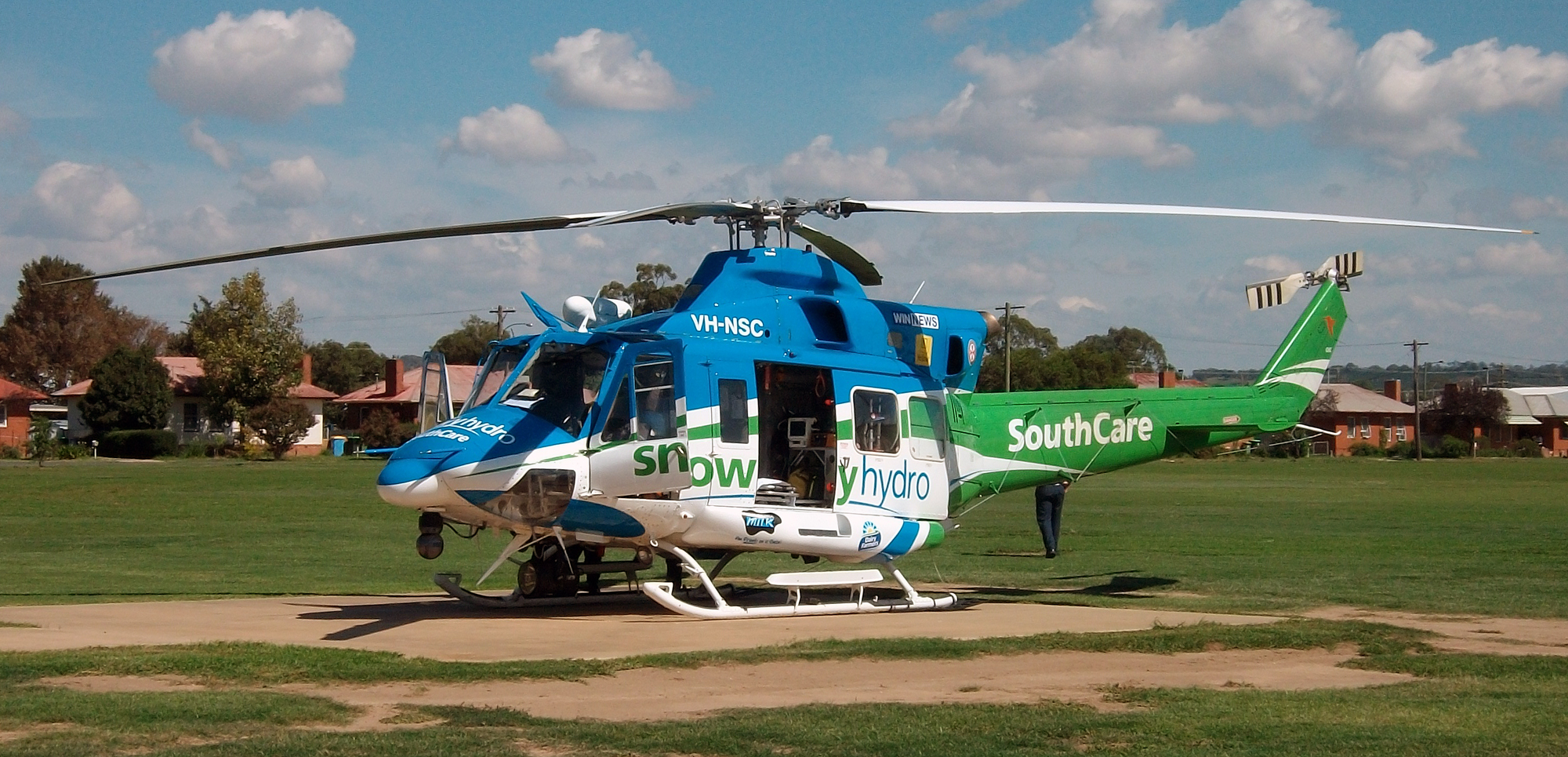
Snowy-Hydro SouthCare helicopter

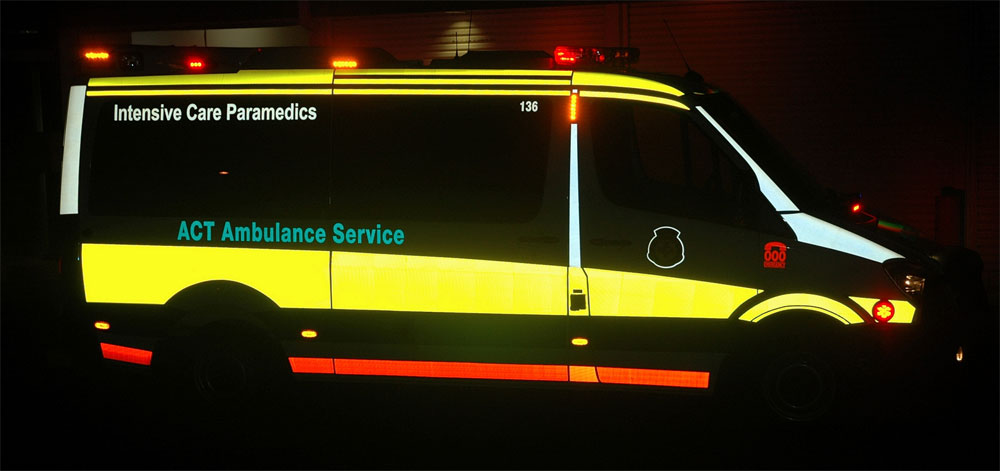
Intensive Care ambulance with reflective markings

== Chief Officers ==
- 1955–1968 Mr Alfred Grant
- 1968–1979 Mr George Harris
- 1979–1983 Mr Milton Anderson
- 1984–1987 Mr Brodie Deans
- 1987–1988 Mr Peter Noakes
- 1988–1993 Mr Noel Gillard
- 1993–2006 Mr Ken Paulsen PSM ASM
- 2006–2015 Mr David Foot ASM
- 2016–2017 Mr Jon Quiggin
- 2017–2025 Mr Howard Wren PSM. ASM
- 2025-present Mr David Dutton

== See also ==
- Australian Capital Territory Emergency Services Agency
- Paramedics in Australia
