= VRA Rescue NSW =

- VRA Rescue NSW (Formally Volunteer Rescue Association)
- Abbreviation: VRA
- Formation: 1969; 57 years ago
- Type: Volunteering; Rescue
- Headquarters: Dubbo, New South Wales
- Location: New South Wales
- Commissioner: Brenton Charlton
- Volunteers: 45 squads
- Website: www.rescue.org.au

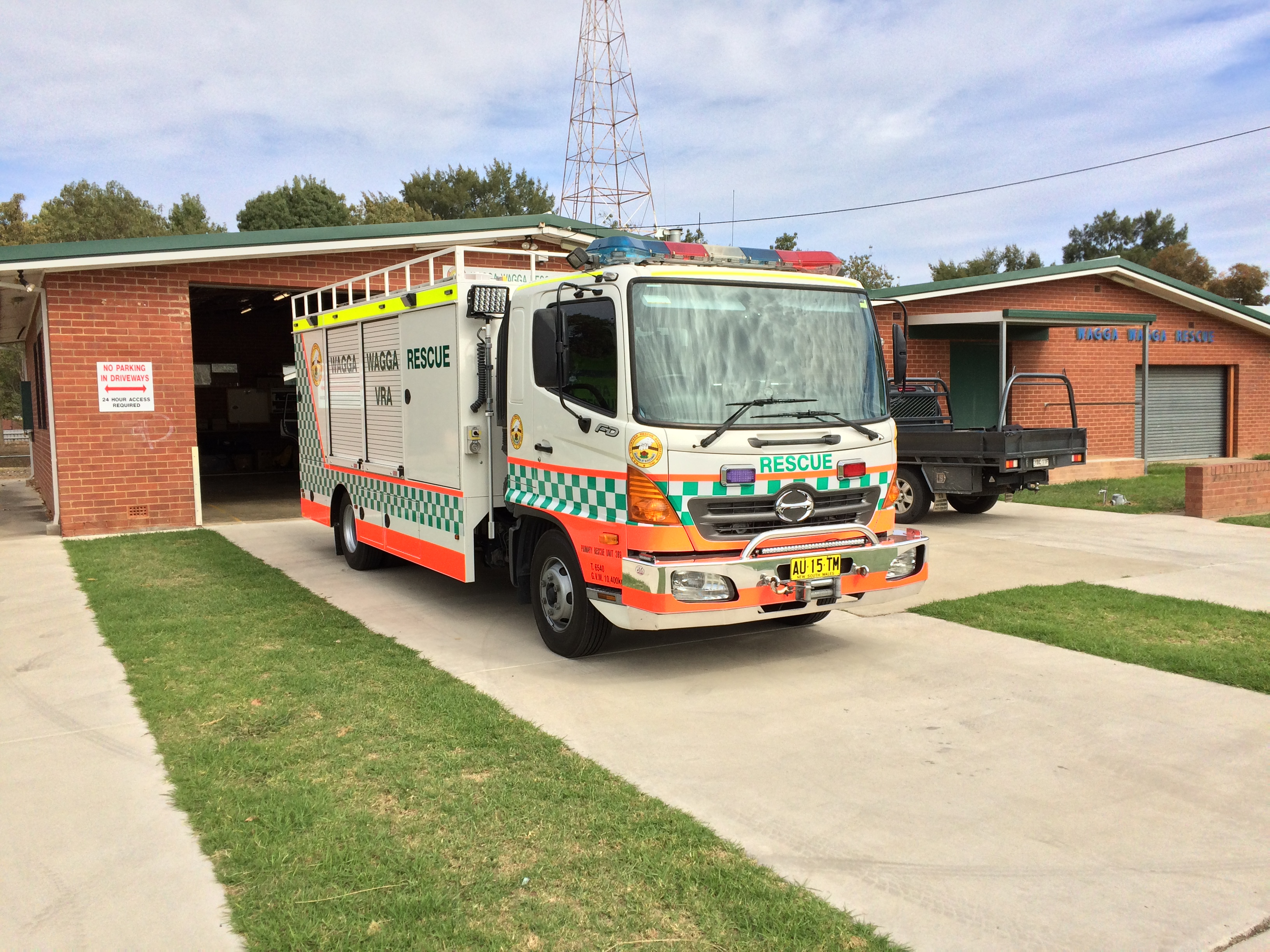
A Hino primary rescue unit at Wagga Wagga station

VRA Rescue NSW (VRA) is an Australian volunteer organisation that provides rescue services to the communities across New South Wales. The first rescue squads formed the Volunteer Rescue Association with the assistance of the New South Wales Police Force. The service is now called VRA Rescue NSW. Groups with common charters can become an affiliate of the Association.

In times of need, whether it be in the emergency or recovery phase, VRA can bring affiliated squads together to provide assistance to other services or to assist one of its own affiliates.

The first VRA specialist squad, Bushwalkers Search and Rescue (today known as NSW SES Bush Search and Rescue) was formed in 1936. The first VRA General Land Rescue Squad was formed in 1950 to assist police with recovery of persons from the Murrumbidgee River, to provide flood rescue, evacuations and ferrying of food and medicines between isolated communities around Wagga Wagga in southern NSW. Soon after the Wagga Wagga Rescue Squad became involved in general land rescue. In 1960 the Bourke Rescue Squad was formed, followed in 1962 by the Dubbo Rescue Squad. In 1969, at the suggestion of the state police commissioner several volunteer rescue squads (Albury, Dubbo, Narrandera and Wagga Wagga) met and formed the Volunteer Rescue Association. VRA Rescue Squads (such as The Mudgee Rescue Squad in January 1975) continued to be established where a need existed and the Police, Ambulance, Fire Brigade and local community supported the establishment of a volunteer rescue squad.

Today, VRA Rescue NSW provides a training structure with competency-based learning under its own registered training organisation, and with policies and procedures affiliated rescue squads provide a comprehensive rescue service to the community. The registered training organisation was formerly VRA Training Pty Ltd. Now RFS Training. VRA Rescue NSW provides a command structure when rescue squads come together, during major incidents, with standardisation of equipment. The squads all come together as a cohesive team.

Regional squads can be either land or marine based. Land-based squads can be involved with motor vehicle accident rescue, vertical rescue, river rescue and dive rescue. Marine-based squads can be involved with coastal emergencies on the north and south coast. In addition, there are specialist squads with particular skills who do not operate in any particular region. Examples of these include squads with bushwalking, cave rescue, radio (communications), Australian Civil Air Patrol (aircraft), and dog expertise.

The current commissioner of VRA Rescue NSW is Brenton Charlton.

== Major incidents attended ==
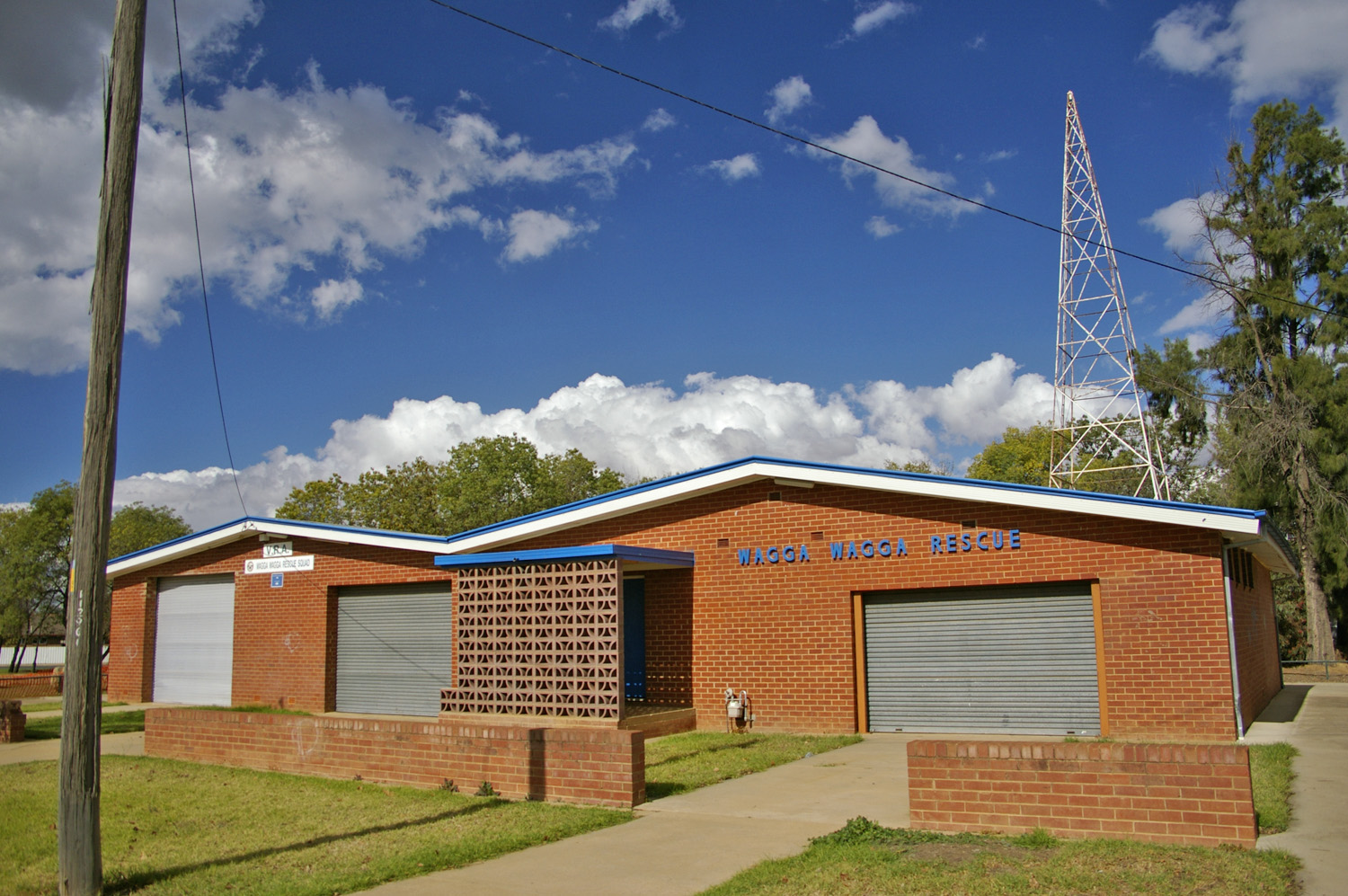
Wagga Wagga Rescue Squad

VRA Rescue NSW is involved on a day-to-day basis in general rescue operations. Primarily, road accident rescue, land and maritime search and rescue operations. VRA Rescue has responded to the following major incidents:

- 1974 Cyclone Tracy, Darwin (Rescue – 124 personnel and equipment available within 6 hours, not responded)
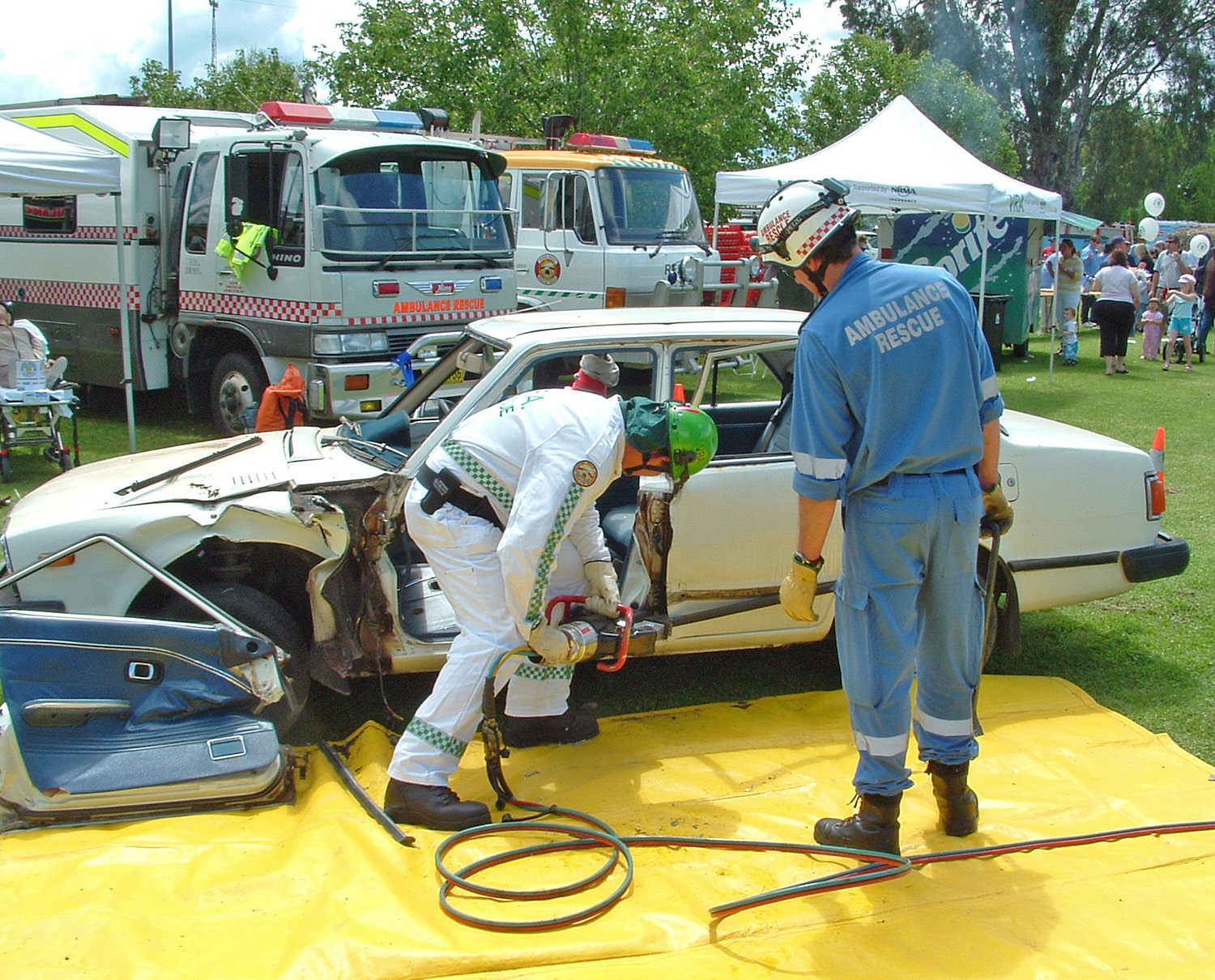
  VRA rescue demonstration
- 1977 Granville rail disaster (Rescue, two rescue squads responded)
- 1989 Newcastle earthquake [Newcastle Workers Club collapse] (Rescue, Two rescue squads responded immediately and subsequently 100 operators and support personnel to sustain 24-hour operations. Communications support)
- 1990 Nyngan flood (Assisted police with evacuations)
- 1994 bush fire emergency (Assist police and ambulance with evacuations, provide communications support and provide welfare support to firefighters, 315 personnel)
- 1997 Thredbo landslide
- 1999 Sydney hailstorm (Assistance to the State Emergency Service)
- 2019-2020 NSW Bushfires (Assist NSW SES, NSW RFS & NSW Police Evacuating People that were in the vicinity of the Fires, telephone answering)
- 2025 Cyclone Alfred (Attended fallen trees and other storm damage)

== Volunteering ==
As with many volunteer organisations, an increasing number of VRA squads face difficulties recruiting sufficient personnel in order to respond effectively to incidents. This has led to a gradual decline in the number of accredited squads from 47 in 2007 down to 32 by 2013. With responsibility moving to other organisations such as Fire and Rescue NSW and the State Emergency Service. VRA has received government funding for new vehicles, equipment and training, $18.8 million over four years.

== Capabilities ==
Capability	Fire Rescue	RFS	SES	VRA	Police Rescue	Ambulance
Vehicle extrication	Yes	Yes	Yes	Yes	Yes	Yes
Community first responder	Yes	Yes	Yes	Yes	Yes	Lead
Flood/Swift water rescue	Yes	Yes	Lead	Yes	Yes	Yes
Storm and flood damage	Yes	Yes	Lead	Yes	No	No
Missing person search	Yes	Yes	Yes	Yes	Lead	Yes
Alpine rescue	Yes	No	Yes	Yes	Lead	Yes
Rope/Vertical rescue	Yes	No	Yes	Yes	Yes	Yes
Urban search and rescue	Lead	Yes	Yes	Yes	Yes	Yes
Animal rescue	Yes	Yes	Yes	Yes	Yes	Yes
Aircraft operations	No	Yes	Yes	Yes	Yes	Yes
Drone operations	Yes	Yes	Yes	Yes	Yes	Yes
Search and rescue dogs	Yes	No	No	Yes	Yes	No
Mounted search and rescue	No	No	No	Yes	Yes	No
Hazmat	Lead	No	No	No	No	No
Tsunami preparedness	No	No	Lead	No	No	No
Structure/Vehicle fires	Lead	Lead	No	No	No	No
Grass/Bush fires	Yes	Lead	No	No	No	No
