= New South Wales State Emergency Service =

Emergency service organisation in Australia

Office of the NSW State Emergency Service
- Logo

- Seal

- Flag

Agency overview
- Formed: 1955
- Preceding agencies: State Emergency Services (April 1955 – September 1955); Civil Defence (September 1955 – 1989)
- Type: Public service executive agency
- Jurisdiction: New South Wales
- Headquarters: 93–99 Burelli Street, Wollongong, New South Wales, Australia
- Employees: 468 Full-time employees (2023) 10,919 Volunteers (2023)
- Minister responsible: Minister for Emergency Services
- Agency executives: Michael Wassing, Commissioner; Daniel Evans, Deputy Commissioner, Operations; Damien Johnston, Deputy Commissioner, Corporate Services; Daniel Austin, Deputy Commissioner, Capability and Training
- Parent agency: Department of Communities and Justice
- Key documents: State Emergency Service Act, 1989 (NSW); State Emergency and Rescue Management Act 1989 (NSW)
- Website: ses.nsw.gov.au

The New South Wales State Emergency Service (NSW SES) is a civil defence organisation under the Government of New South Wales that provides emergency and rescue services to local communities during and after major disasters. The NSW SES is made up almost entirely of volunteer members, numbering over 10,919 as of September 2023. Personnel are easily identified by their distinctive orange overalls.

From 1955 up until the 1970s, the NSW SES was previously named the Civil Defence Service, in recognition of its role in Cold War-era disaster planning.

The agency is led by a commissioner who reports to the Minister for Emergency Services.

== Leadership ==
The current Commissioner of the NSW SES is Michael Wassing who commenced in the role on 2 December 2024.

The Minister for Emergency Services, is responsible to the NSW parliament for the emergency services portfolio which includes NSW SES.

Prior to 1989 the NSW SES reported through a Pro-Director to the Commissioner of Police

NSW SES Directors General and Commissioners (including acting appointments)
| Name | Title | Term start | Term end | Postnominals | Comments | Notes |
|---|---|---|---|---|---|---|
| Major General Brian 'Hori' Howard | Director General | Late 1989 | 27 August 2001 | AO, ESM, MC | | |
| Brigadier Philip McNamara | Director General | 27 August 2001 | September 2008 | CSC, ESM | | |
| Murray Kear | Director General / Commissioner | September 2008 | 7 November 2013 | AFSM | Officially resigned 12 June 2014 | |
| Jim Smith | Acting Commissioner | 7 November 2013 | 5 January 2015 | AFSM | Fire and Rescue NSW Deputy Commissioner | |
| Adam Dent | Commissioner | 5 January 2015 | 30 January 2016 | | | |
| Greg Newton | Acting Commissioner | 30 January 2016 | 27 February 2017 | | NSW SES Deputy Commissioner | |
| Mark Smethurst | Commissioner | 27 February 2017 | 8 March 2019 | DSC, AM | | |
| Kyle Stewart | Acting Commissioner | 8 March 2019 | 30 October 2019 | APM | NSW Police Force Assistant Commissioner | |
| Carlene York | Commissioner | 30 October 2019 | 3 May 2024 | APM | Previously NSW Police Force Assistant Commissioner, Commander of Human Resources. | |
| Michael Wassing | Commissioner | 2 December 2024 | | | Former Deputy Commissioner of Queensland Fire and Emergency Services | |

== Emergency support ==
SES volunteers undergoing flood rescue training, in 2016

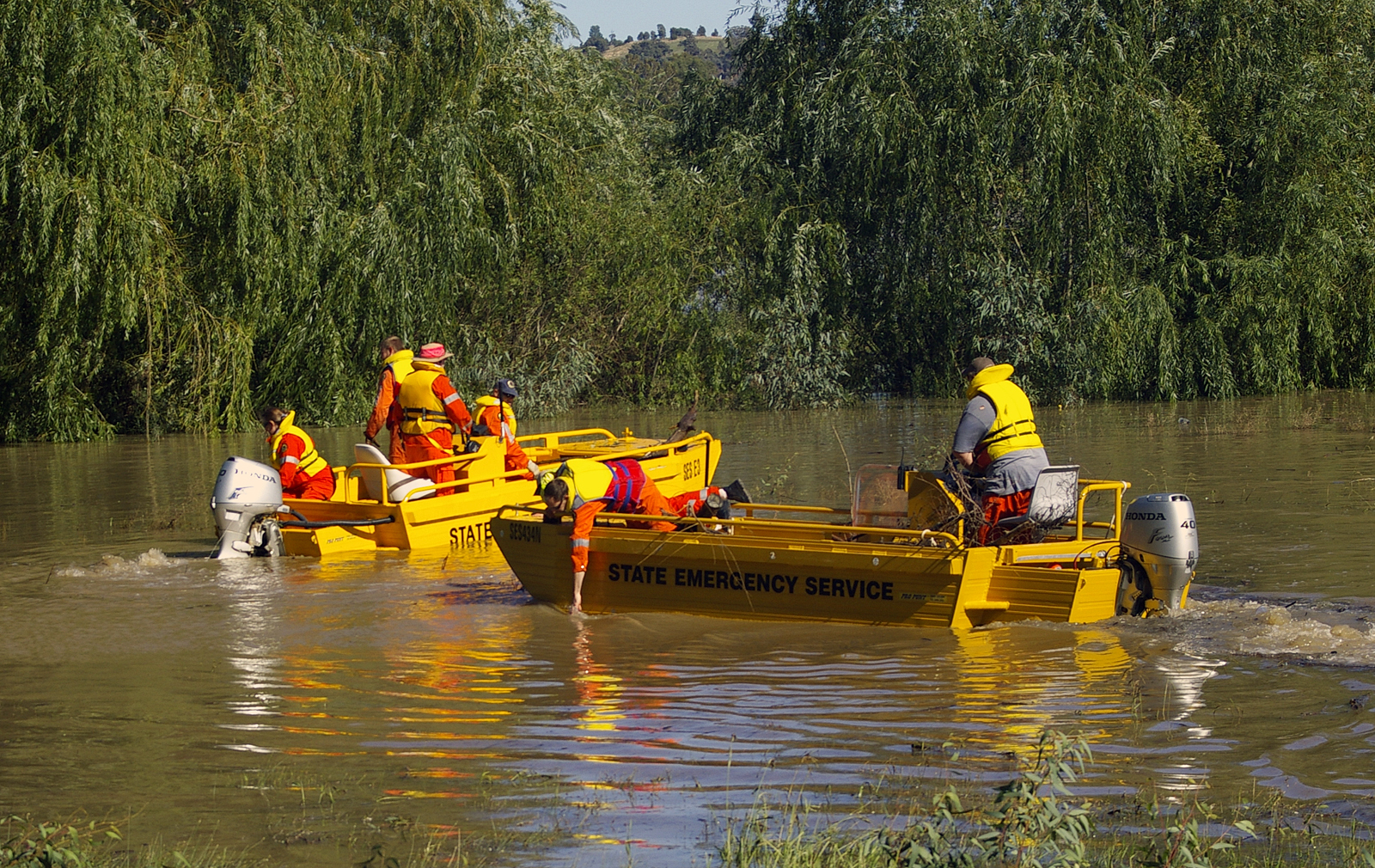
SES volunteers removing debris from Lake Albert, in 2010

The major responsibilities of the NSW SES are for flood (including Flood Rescue), tsunami and storm operations. The NSW SES also provides the majority of General Land Rescue effort in the rural parts of the state. This includes road crash rescue, vertical rescue, general rescue, bush search and rescue, evidence searches (both metropolitan and rural) and other forms of specialist rescue that may be required due to local threats. The Service's trained rescuers also support the full-time emergency services during major disasters.

The NSW SES also assist other emergency services when they are performing major operations. These services include the New South Wales Police Force, NSW Rural Fire Service, Fire and Rescue NSW and New South Wales Ambulance.

During the 22/23 Financial Year, NSW SES Personnel answered 113,722 calls at the State Operations Centre. Volunteers responded to 47,241 incidents, including 24,043 Storm damage incidents and 1,548 Flood Rescues.

== Organisational Structure ==
=== State level ===
The State Headquarters (SHQ) of the NSW SES is located in Burelli Street, Wollongong.

At a state level, the NSW SES Commissioner leads the agency and has three deputy commissioners, who each lead a key area of the agency. Operations, Operational Capability & Training and Corporate Services.

Each deputy commissioner leads multiple directorates (Emergency Management, North & West Operations, Metro & South Operations, Operational Capability and Training, Operational Systems Program (Temporary), Flood Rescue Enhancement Program (Temporary), Information & Communications Technology, People & Development, Finance, Asset & Business Services, Elevate Program (Temporary) and Organisation Strategy, Planning & Performance).

Every directorate is led by a director, who has multiple senior managers reporting to them. Directors who lead a directorate which has direct operational responsibilities is appointed to the rank of assistant commissioner. All other directors do not hold an operational rank.

=== Zone level ===
The state is split up into seven zones (North Western, North Eastern, Northern, Metro, Western, Southern and South Eastern).

Each zone is led by a zone commander who reports to the assistant commissioner responsible for that Operational Area. Deputy zone commanders are also appointed and assigned a command area within that zone. The zone is also staffed with a range of operational and administrative support personnel, including roles such as: Operational Readiness, Volunteer Engagement, Business Services and Planning & Research. Zone staff work out of the Zone Headquarters (ZHQ).

Zones may also have capability units, whose purpose are to provide incident management and other specialised support to units. These capability units are often composed and led by volunteers, operating directly under zone leadership.

In 2023, Commissioner Carlene York announced an investment into SES Facilities from the Government of New South Wales. As part of this investment, the SES created an additional two zones (North Western and North Eastern) in addition to its five existing zones, effectively splitting up the Northern and Western Zones into four zones.

Prior 2 October 2018, the SES was composed of 17 regions, based on river catchment areas. This was inline with the NSW SES responsibility to manage flood events, however an analysis of the demands placed upon the service indicates that a more effective way to organise units would be based around areas which both reflected historic trends in terms of affected areas, and the distribution of the population across the state. This resulted in the formation of five zones as part of the organisational restructure project.

Old Regions vs New Zones
| Prior to 2018 | | 2018 to 2022 | | From 2022 | |
| Region Name | Region Code | Zone Name | Zone Code | Zone Name | Zone Code |
|---|---|---|---|---|---|
| Sydney Northern Region | SNR | Metro Zone | MTZ | Metro Zone | MTZ |
| Sydney Southern Region | SSR | Metro Zone | MTZ | Metro Zone | MTZ |
| Sydney Western Region | SWR | Metro Zone | MTZ | Metro Zone | MTZ |
| Central West Region | CWR | Western Zone | WTZ | Western Zone | WTZ |
| Far West Region | FWR | Western Zone | WTZ | Western Zone | WTZ |
| Macquarie Region | MQR | Western Zone | WTZ | Western Zone | WTZ |
| North West Region | NWR | Western Zone | WTZ | North Western Zone | NWZ |
| Namoi Region | NMR | Western Zone | WTZ | North Western Zone | NWZ |
| Lachlan Region | LAR | Southern Zone | SHZ | Southern Zone | SHZ |
| Murray Region | MYR | Southern Zone | SHZ | Southern Zone | SHZ |
| Murrumbidgee Region | MER | Southern Zone | SHZ | Southern Zone | SHZ |
| Hunter Region | HUR | Northern Zone | NHZ | Northern Zone | NHZ |
| Mid North Coast Region | MNR | Northern Zone | NHZ | Northern Zone | NHZ |
| Clarence-Numbucca Region | CNR | Northern Zone | NHZ | North Eastern Zone | NEZ |
| Richmond-Tweed Region | RTR | Northern Zone | NHZ | North Eastern Zone | NEZ |
| Southern Highlands Region | SHR | South East Zone | SEZ | South East Zone | SEZ |
| Illawarra South Coast Region | ISR | South East Zone | SEZ | South East Zone | SEZ |

=== Cluster Level ===
Dependent on factors such local operational demands, local Unit sizes, etc. Units can be grouped into Clusters. A cluster may contain 2–7 Units.

NSW SES Clusters are managed by a volunteer Local Commander. Local Commanders oversee operations at a scale between localised events which can be managed at a Unit Level, and larger scale events which require management at a Zone Level. Some Clusters may also, dependent on size and operational demands, have a Deputy Local Commander.

Each Cluster is a part of a Zone Command Area and report to one of the Deputy Zone Commanders.

=== Unit Level ===
There are 261 SES Units forming the NSW SES. Most are based on the former local government boundaries prior to the 2013–2016 council amalgamations, although the NSW SES now also allows for the formation of Units which are not bound to geographic boundaries, such as the NSW SES Bush Search and Rescue Unit.

State Units
| Unit Name | Unit Code |
|---|---|
| Aviation Management | AMU |
| Bush Search & Rescue | BSR |
| Alpine Search & Rescue | ASR |
| Peer Support & Chaplaincy | PSU |
| Operational Support | OSU |

NSW SES Units are completely staffed by volunteers managed by volunteer Unit Commanders. In the case where the unit is not part of a cluster, and it has an assigned geographical area, the Unit Commander may also act as the Local Commander.

== Fleet ==
The New South Wales SES maintains a fleet of 992 vehicles, 441 vessels, and 1007 trailers. Fleet vehicles are identified by three letters, followed by two or three numbers and letters, such as SWN32.

- The first three letters (SWN) identify the unit (Swansea)
- The first digit (3) identifies the vehicle category:
  - 0 – Legacy Fleet
  - 1 – General Purpose Command
  - 2 – Forward Command
  - 3 – Storm
  - 4 – Rescue
  - 5 – Logistics
  - 6 – Small Vehicles
  - 7 – Vessels
  - 8 – Corporate
  - 9 – reserved for future use
- The first and second digit together (32) identify the vehicle category
- If a unit has multiple vehicles from the same category, then a suffix may used, such as 32A and 32B.

The bulk of SES vehicles used to be provided by the local council, as part of their contribution to the Local SES Units. More recently, however, funding from the Government of New South Wales has allowed for a standardised fleet of vehicles to be obtained for the SES. This has allowed the services to provide vehicles that are fit-for-task and reduce the average fleet age to under 20 years.

| Class | Name | Make/Model | Cost | Photo |
|---|---|---|---|---|
| 01; 02; 03; 04 | Legacy Fleet | non-standardised | varies | |
| 14; 15; 16; 17; 18; 19 | SUV Command Vehicle | Isuzu MU-X or Toyota Land Cruiser Prado or Hyundai Santa Fe | A$62,000 | |
| 27 | Forward Command Van | Mercedes-Benz Sprinter | A$500,000 | |
| 29 | Forward Command Truck | | | |
| 31; 32; 33 | Light Storm | Mercedes-Benz Sprinter Crew Cab, heavily modified by R.A. Bell Environmental. | A$185,000 | |
| 34; 35; 36; 37; 38 | Medium Storm | Isuzu NPR | A$245,000 | |
| 41 | Community first responder | Isuzu D-MAX | A$163,000 | |
| 43 | Light Flood Rescue | Toyota Land Cruiser 70 series | A$270,000 | |
| 44 | Light Rescue | Toyota Land Cruiser 70 series | | |
| 45; 46 | Medium Rescue | Isuzu NPR | A$360,000 | |
| 48 | Heavy Rescue | Isuzu FRR 110-260 | A$420,000 | |
| 49 | Flood Rescue Unimog | Mercedes-Benz Unimog | A$800,000 | |
| 53 | Fleet Flatbed truck | Isuzu FRR 500 Table Top | | |
| 55 | Bus | Toyota Coaster | | |
| 55 | Minivan | Toyota HiAce | | |
| 52; 55; 56; 57; 58 | General Purpose Vehicle | Isuzu D-MAX | A$90,000 | |
| SES 58; SES 59 | Logistics Unimog | Mercedes-Benz Unimog | A$1,000,000 | |
| SES 59 | Flatbed truck | Volvo FM500 | | |
| FLT 59 | Mobile Incident Command Centre | Isuzu FRR 500 Table Top | | |
| SHZ 59 | Logistics Van | Mercedes-Benz Sprinter | | |
| OSU 59 | Cell on Wheels | | | |
| TRG 59 | Flood Rescue Training Equipment | | | |
| 692 | ATV | Can-Am Defender XT | | |
| | Rescue Raft | Arkangel | | |
| 711; 712 | Inflatable rescue boat | | | |
| 721; 722 | Bowloader | Yamba 479 Pro Punt | A$145,000 | |
| 731; 732 | Boat | Yamba 550 V-Hull Punt | | |
| 741; 742 | Bowloader | | A$145,000 | |
| | Boat | | | |
| 82; 83 | Corporate Command Vehicle | Hyundai Santa Fe | | |
| 87 | Corporate Minivan | Toyota HiAce | | |

=== Vehicle as a Node (VAAN) ===
In early 2023, the SES, working with the NSW Telco Authority and Motorola, started trialing the technology, becoming one of the first Emergency Service Agencies in New South Wales, to utilise the technology.

Vehicle as a node utilises Motorola's SmartConnect technology to provide seamless connectivity for operational communications, even when there is no Public Safety Network (PSN) coverage. When outside of coverage of the PSN, SmartConnect utilises cellular (4G) and satellite connectivity to maintain operational communications.

By August 2023, there were over 1,300 vehicles across the SES and Fire and Rescue New South Wales Fleet now utilising the technology. This provides the ability for SES crews to maintain operational communications regardless of their geographical location and surrounding topography. The Public Safety Network (PSN) only covers around 80% of the State.

=== High Clearance Vehicles (HCV) ===
In June 2024, the SES was internationally recognised for its research, development and introduction of the nation's most advanced High Clearance vehicles into the Flood Rescue space. The SES was awarded the Special Commendation Award at the Higgins and Langley Memorial Awards in the United States.

These vehicles represent a significant enhancement of the Agency's Flood Rescue capabilities. The vehicles can travel in water up-to 1.2 metres deep, keep flood rescue operators safe whilst performing rescues. The Agency's latest vehicles include advanced features such as forward-scanning SONAR, front and rear hydraulic winches and a vehicle loading crane, which can be used to load rescue boats into the vehicle.

== Rank and Insignia ==
In January 2018 the NSW State Emergency Service commenced a review of the rank and insignia structure within the organisation. Between October and December 2018 all members of the NSW State Emergency Service transitioned to the new rank structure.

Executive Appointments
| Epaulette | Rank | Pre-2018 Rank |
|---|---|---|
| | Commissioner | |
| | Deputy Commissioner | |
| | Assistant Commissioner | Assistant Commissioner; Director |

Service Appointments
| Epaulette | Rank | Pre-2018 Rank |
|---|---|---|
| | Zone Commander | Region Controller; State HQ Department Manager |
| | Deputy Zone Commander | Deputy Region Controller; State HQ Department Assistant Manager; State Protocol Officer |
| | Chief Inspector | Local Controller; Region Business Manager; Region Learning & Development Officer; Region Community Engagement Coordinator; Alpine Coordinator |
| | Inspector | Unit Controller; Deputy Local Controller |
| | Senior Group Officer | Deputy Unit Controller |
| | Group Officer | Officer; Region Business Services Officer; Volunteer Support Officer |

Local Appointments
| Epaulette | Rank | Pre-2018 Rank |
|---|---|---|
| | Leading Senior Operator | Deputy Officer |
| | Senior Operator | Team Leader |
| | Operator | Deputy Team Leader |
| | Job Ready | All Others |
| | Cadet | |

Other
| Epaulette | Rank |
|---|---|
| | Chaplain (Jewish) |
| | Chaplain (Christian) |
| | Senior Chaplain (Christian) |
| | Operations |
| | Media |
| | Peer Support Group |
| | Community Education |
| | Community Engagement |
| | Band Drum Major |
| | Band Sergeant |
| | Band Team Leader |
| | Senior Band Member |
| | Band Member |

== Capabilities ==
| Capability | Fire Rescue | RFS | SES | VRA | Police Rescue | Ambulance |
|---|---|---|---|---|---|---|
| Vehicle extrication | Yes | Yes | Yes | Yes | Yes | Yes |
| Community first responder | Yes | Yes | Yes | Yes | Yes | Lead |
| Flood/Swift water rescue | Yes | Yes | Lead | Yes | Yes | Yes |
| Storm and flood damage | Yes | Yes | Lead | Yes | No | No |
| Missing person search | Yes | Yes | Yes | Yes | Lead | Yes |
| Alpine rescue | Yes | No | Yes | Yes | Lead | Yes |
| Rope/Vertical rescue | Yes | No | Yes | Yes | Yes | Yes |
| Urban search and rescue | Lead | Yes | Yes | Yes | Yes | Yes |
| Animal rescue | Yes | Yes | Yes | Yes | Yes | Yes |
| Aircraft operations | No | Yes | Yes | Yes | Yes | Yes |
| Drone operations | Yes | Yes | Yes | Yes | Yes | Yes |
| Search and rescue dogs | Yes | No | No | Yes | Yes | No |
| Mounted search and rescue | No | No | No | Yes | Yes | No |
| Hazmat | Lead | No | No | No | No | No |
| Tsunami preparedness | No | No | Lead | No | No | No |
| Structure/Vehicle fires | Lead | Lead | No | No | No | No |
| Grass/Bush fires | Yes | Lead | No | No | No | No |

== Honours and awards ==
| Emergency Service Medal (ESM) |
| National Emergency Medal |
| National Medal |
| NSW SES Commissioner's Commendation for Courage |
| NSW SES Commissioner's Commendation for Service |
| NSW SES Long Service Medal |
NSW SES Long Service Badge – 5 years
| NSW SES Commissioner's Unit Citation |
| NSW SES Life Member |

== Funding and support ==
The NSW SES receives funding primarily from the Government of New South Wales. Resources are often obtained through numerous grants provided by public and private entities.

== See also ==
- State Emergency Service
- National Council for Fire & Emergency Services
