= New South Wales Ambulance =

Provider of emergency care in Australia

NSW Ambulance
- Seal

- Flag

Agency overview
- Formed: 2014; 12 years ago
- Preceding agencies: Civil Ambulance and Transport Brigade (1895–1904); Civil Ambulance and Transport Corps (1904–1921); NSW Ambulance Transport Service Board (1921–1977); Ambulance Service of New South Wales (1977–2014)
- Jurisdiction: New South Wales
- Headquarters: Sydney Olympic Park, New South Wales, Australia
- Employees: 6,100+
- Minister responsible: Ryan Park, Minister for Health
- Agency executive: Dr Dominic Morgan ASM, Chief Executive
- Parent department: NSW Health
- Key document: Health Services Act 1997 (NSW)
- Website: ambulance.nsw.gov.au

NSW Ambulance, previously the Ambulance Service of NSW, is an agency of NSW Health and the statutory provider of pre-hospital emergency care and ambulance services in the state of New South Wales, Australia.

Established pursuant to the Ambulance Services Act, 1976 (NSW) and operating within the Health Services Act, 1997 (NSW), the service provides clinical care and health related transport services to over 7.9 million people in New South Wales (NSW), across an area of 801,600 square kilometres (309,500 sq mi).

NSW Ambulance employs more than 6,100 staff including 4,952 paramedics who operate over 1,600 response vehicles from 220 locations across the state. The service responds to around 1.1 million calls a year, with an average response time of 7.47 minutes to 1A emergencies (cardiac or respiratory arrests), against a target of 10 minutes.

In 2018, paramedicine became a regulated profession, legally protecting the title of paramedic and establishing mandatory professional standards for practitioners. Health Practitioner Regulation National Law (NSW) and the Australian Health Practitioner Regulation Agency provide minimum requirements to ensure that paramedics in Australia are competent, qualified, and able to provide safe and effective care to the public. Other requirements include holding an accredited qualification, being fit to practice, and passing a criminal history check.

NSW Ambulance headquarters officially moved to Sydney Olympic Park in 2024, joining the NSW Police Force Recruitment Branch and NSW Rural Fire Service Headquarters. They had previously been located at Callan Park in Rozelle, NSW for almost 30 years (uncited). Some NSW Ambulance functions, such as Communications Education and Virtual Clinical Care Centre (VCCC), operate at the former Gladesville Hospital site.

== History ==
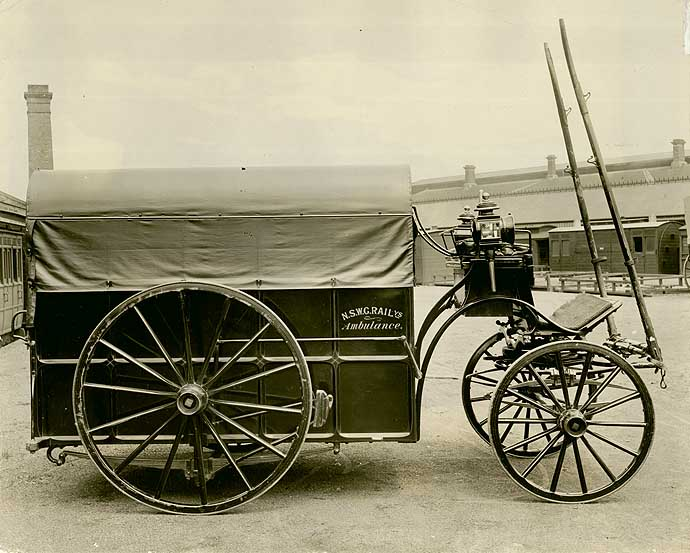
NSW Government Railway Ambulance Corps wagon in 1890.

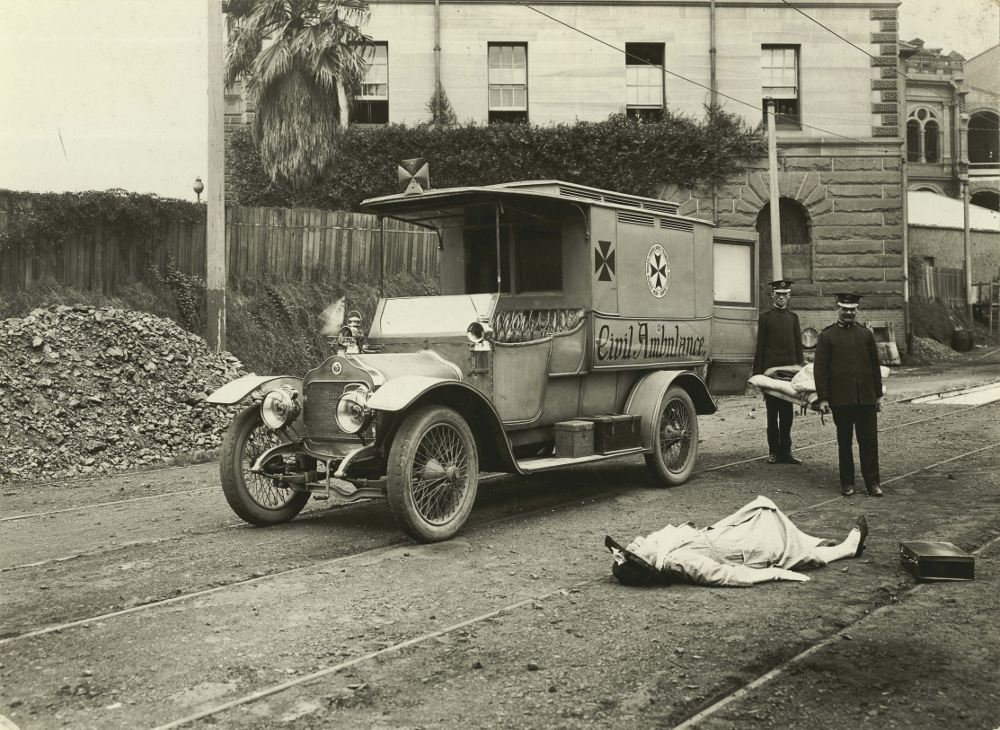
One of the first motorised ambulances, donated to the Ambulance Corps in 1912

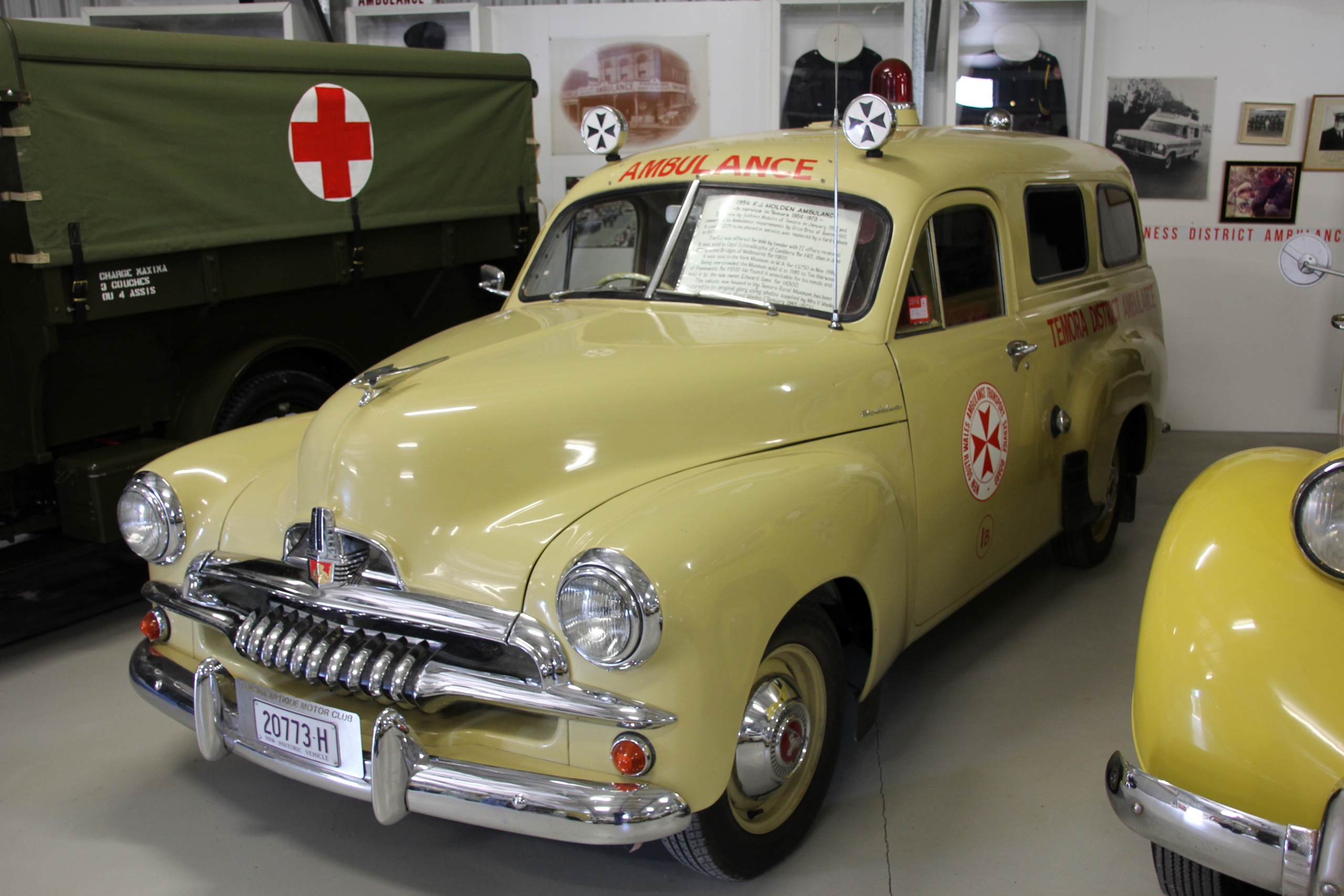
A 1956 Holden FJ ambulance

The first recognised ambulance service in New South Wales, known as the Civil Ambulance and Transport Brigade, commenced operations on April 1, 1895. Their first ambulance station was a borrowed police station in Railway Square, Sydney, which was staffed by two permanent officers. At the time, patients were transported on hand-held stretchers and hand-litters. As demand grew, so did the service and they were soon transporting over 2,000 patients a year. In 1905, they were reorganised into the Ambulance Transport Corps. In 1910, they opened their first station on the west side of the city, occupying the former parcels office at Summer Hill Railway Station.

In 1912, the first motorised ambulance entered service with the Corps, followed by two ambulance trams in 1915. The service was then renamed the NSW Ambulance Transport Service Board in 1921, with further technological advances such as the installation of radios in ambulance vehicles by the mid-1930s. By 1937, the Central District ambulance fleet had grown to 15 vehicles, with many others operating in districts across the state.

In 1958, the first fibreglass-body ambulances entered service, marking a significant advancement in the design towards the modern ambulance. In 1962, Station Officer Jim Smith (a former rigger at the Port Kembla Steelworks) became the first rescue trained ambulance officer in NSW. He received training from the existing Police Rescue Squad, and subsequently commenced operations on the service's new 'Q' (Rescue) Van. In 1967, the Air Ambulance Service was established, operating a single Beechcraft Queen Air B80. Over the next ten years, this would grow to a fleet of five aircraft. In 1970, the service purchased 45 new Ford F100 ambulances, which would become the face of the fleet for many years to come. By the late 1970s and 1980s, Intensive Care Paramedics were introduced, allowing the service to bring unprecedented levels of pre-hospital care to patients. In 1985, the Air Ambulance fleet received further upgrades with four new King Air B200Cs.

As the importance of pre-hospital care skyrocketed in the service, the Special Casualty Access Team (SCAT) was formed in 1986. This team of elite paramedics brought intensive care to patients in the most extreme of situations, ranging from cliff falls to building collapses. SCAT Paramedics were trained in a range of skills including climbing, winching, breathing apparatus, CBRNE, caving, canyoning, USAR, bushcraft, four wheel driving and wilderness survival. A major step forward for the service came in 1991, when every ambulance in NSW was equipped with a defibrillator. In 2004, both immediate and long distance care were enhanced across NSW, with the purchase of new rapid response cars and new Air Ambulances (four King Air 200s). The late 2000s saw vast increases to the service's specialist capabilities, with the creation of the Medical Retrieval Unit, the Special Operations Team and the Extended Care Program, making the service one of the most advanced providers of pre-hospital care in the world.

== Paramedics ==
Paramedics provide frontline healthcare, responding to all types of emergencies across the state. Paramedics are highly trained in a broad variety of medical skills to assess patients’ conditions, make quick decisions, and perform life-saving procedures, often in high-pressure environments. Paramedics are required to hold an accredited degree, or be assessed to have equivalent qualifications alongside experience.

Intensive Care Paramedics (ICP) are highly skilled and experienced paramedics, who provide advanced intensive patient care. Their extensive experience and training allows them to conduct advanced medical procedures in the field and administer specialist drugs to seriously ill or injured patients.

Extended Care Paramedics (ECP) are specialist paramedics who take a ‘GP’ type approach to non emergency incidents. Their role is to ease the workload of emergency ambulance crews by dealing with non emergency incidents using specialist training and techniques. These include prescribing medication, changing catheters and resetting dislocations among many other skills.

Critical Care Paramedics (CCP) are paramedics assigned to the Medical Retrieval Unit. As well as intensive care skills, they're trained in Special Operations, allowing them to work in hostile environments such as building collapses, floods, caves, cliffs and remote bushland. They also have the ability to perform complex medical procedures and administer highly specialist drugs in the field to patients, under the authorisation of a Critical Care Doctor.

Duty Operations Managers (DOM) are senior paramedic inspectors responsible for supervising clinical operations and managing crews on shift across each ambulance zone. They provide an experienced oversight at complex medical incidents, supporting paramedics with patient management and treatment. DOMs are qualified Paramedics with additional formal qualifications in management and leadership, with a strong background of medical experience and leadership.

Community First Responders (CFR) are part-time and volunteer members of other emergency services or community members trained in nationally accredited advanced medical skills, who respond to medical emergencies in conjunction with Paramedics in remote areas of the state. There are 33 CFR units in total; 11 Fire and Rescue NSW, 11 NSW State Emergency Service and 12 Rural Fire Service, with each unit generally carrying their complement of medical equipment on board existing response vehicles such as fire engines.

== Incidents ==
The New South Wales Government has admitted to failings regarding the death of David Iredale, a high school student who died of dehydration in the bush near Katoomba, New South Wales, in late 2006. Iredale called 000 several times for help before he died. The NSW Ambulance Service Triple Zero call centre was accused of inappropriately handling Iredale's calls; he was not given any medical advice, and operators were accused of being "preoccupied" with obtaining a street address to send help to, although Iredale was in the bush. An inquest set up to investigate failings in the 000 system as a result of his death identified serious issues in the practices used by 000 operators.

== Response priorities ==
NSW Ambulance prioritise cases into several priority levels based on the urgency of the case, which are categorised into:

- Urgent – Lights and Sirens Response
  - Category 1 (Highest Priority) – Patient not breathing / ineffective breathing
  - Category 2 (Priority) – Urgent response required
- Non urgent - Response without Lights and Sirens
  - Category 3 – Attend within 30 minutes
  - Category 4 – Attend within 60 minutes
- Category 5 – Urgent Medical Transfer (Can be upgraded to Lights and Sirens depending on situation)
  - The remainder of the priority levels are made up of various priority transfers.

As of early 2019, NSW Ambulance attended over two thirds of Priority 1 calls within 30 minutes.

== Special Operations ==
The Special Operations Team (SOT) are responsible for specialised ambulance operations across the state. Their role is to bring paramedic level care to patients in any kind of hostile environment including cliffs, canyons, caves, floods, bushfires, building collapses, confined spaces, hazardous materials incidents, active shooters and the remote Australian wilderness.

SOT operate on a day-to-day basis from rapid response vehicles spread across Sydney, Wollongong and the Central Coast, located at St Ives, Bankstown, Picton, Caringbah, Point Clare, Wollongong, Northmead, and Katoomba and Lithgow in the Blue Mountains. They additionally operate a number of specialist vehicles from their Special Operations Base at Sydney Olympic Park, including 4WD Ambulances and numerous specialist support vehicles.

In some rural areas of Regional NSW, SOT are trained and equipped as primary rescue units, allowing them to extricate patients in addition to their medical access role. They operate six Rescue Units, based at Wagga Wagga, Singleton, Tamworth, Bomaderry, Cowra and Rutherford, with two spare vehicles located in Sydney. These Rescue Units are equipped with a range of rescue tools including battery extrication equipment and rope rescue gear. In the winter months, the Alpine Operations Team is active, based at Perisher Valley, this specialised team of 20 paramedics provide patient access and care to the entire NSW Alpine region. The Alpine Operations Team utilises unconventional vehicles to access patients, from snowmobiles to over-snow ambulances and their paramedics are specifically trained in overnight camping, search and rescue and avalanche recovery.

SOT is also responsible for providing the Tactical Medical Operations capability for NSW Ambulance. SOT was the first full-time Tactical Paramedic Team in Australia working in conjunction with the NSW Police Force Tactical Operations Unit.

Capability	Fire Rescue	RFS	SES	VRA	Police Rescue	Ambulance
Vehicle extrication	Yes	Yes	Yes	Yes	Yes	Yes
Community first responder	Yes	Yes	Yes	Yes	Yes	Lead
Flood/Swift water rescue	Yes	Yes	Lead	Yes	Yes	Yes
Storm and flood damage	Yes	Yes	Lead	Yes	No	No
Missing person search	Yes	Yes	Yes	Yes	Lead	Yes
Alpine rescue	Yes	No	Yes	Yes	Lead	Yes
Rope/Vertical rescue	Yes	No	Yes	Yes	Yes	Yes
Urban search and rescue	Lead	Yes	Yes	Yes	Yes	Yes
Animal rescue	Yes	Yes	Yes	Yes	Yes	Yes
Aircraft operations	No	Yes	Yes	Yes	Yes	Yes
Drone operations	Yes	Yes	Yes	Yes	Yes	Yes
Search and rescue dogs	Yes	No	No	Yes	Yes	No
Mounted search and rescue	No	No	No	Yes	Yes	No
Hazmat	Lead	No	No	No	No	No
Tsunami preparedness	No	No	Lead	No	No	No
Structure/Vehicle fires	Lead	Lead	No	No	No	No
Grass/Bush fires	Yes	Lead	No	No	No	No

== Medical Retrieval ==
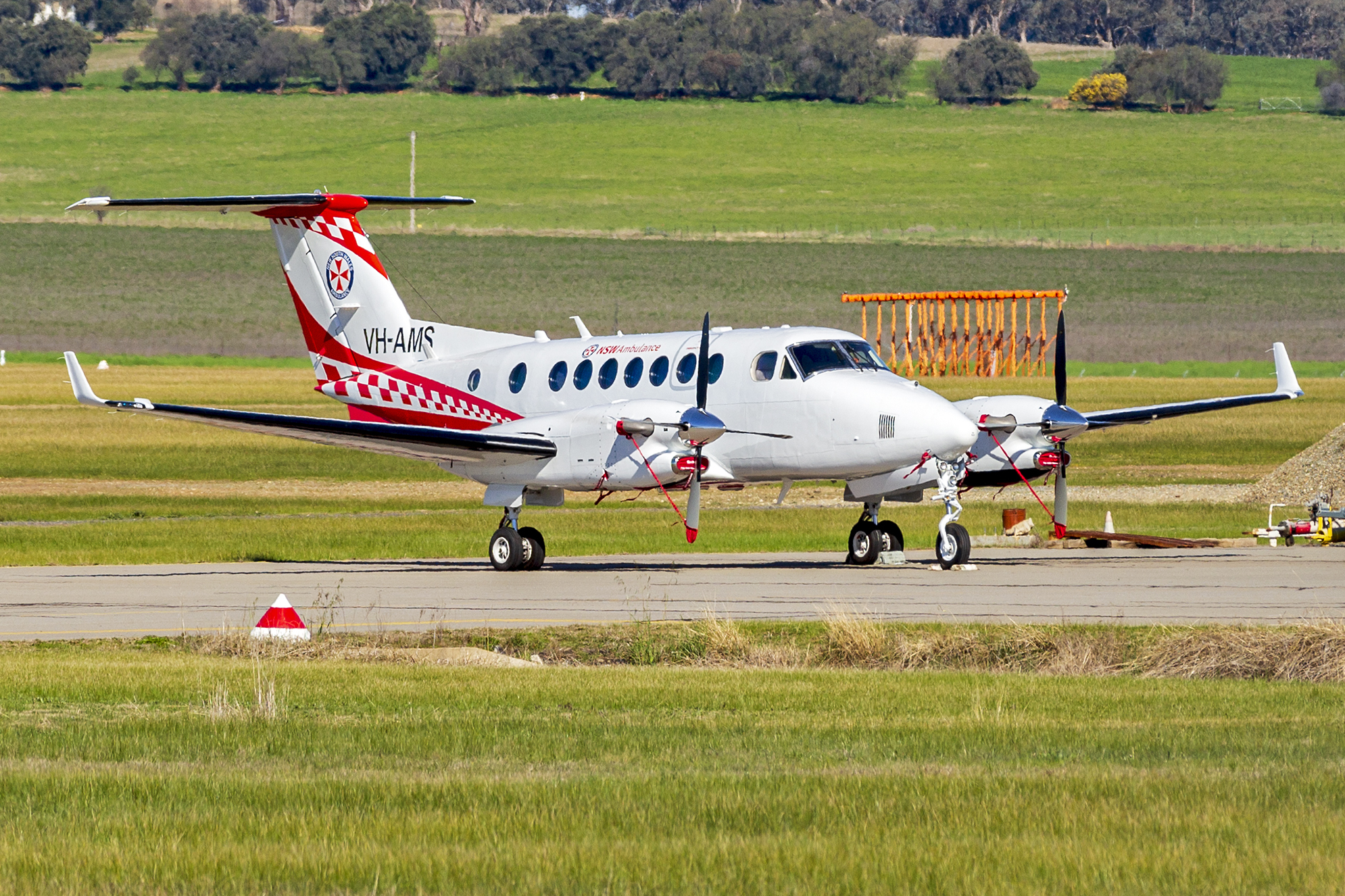
Beechcraft King Air B350C at Wagga Wagga Airport

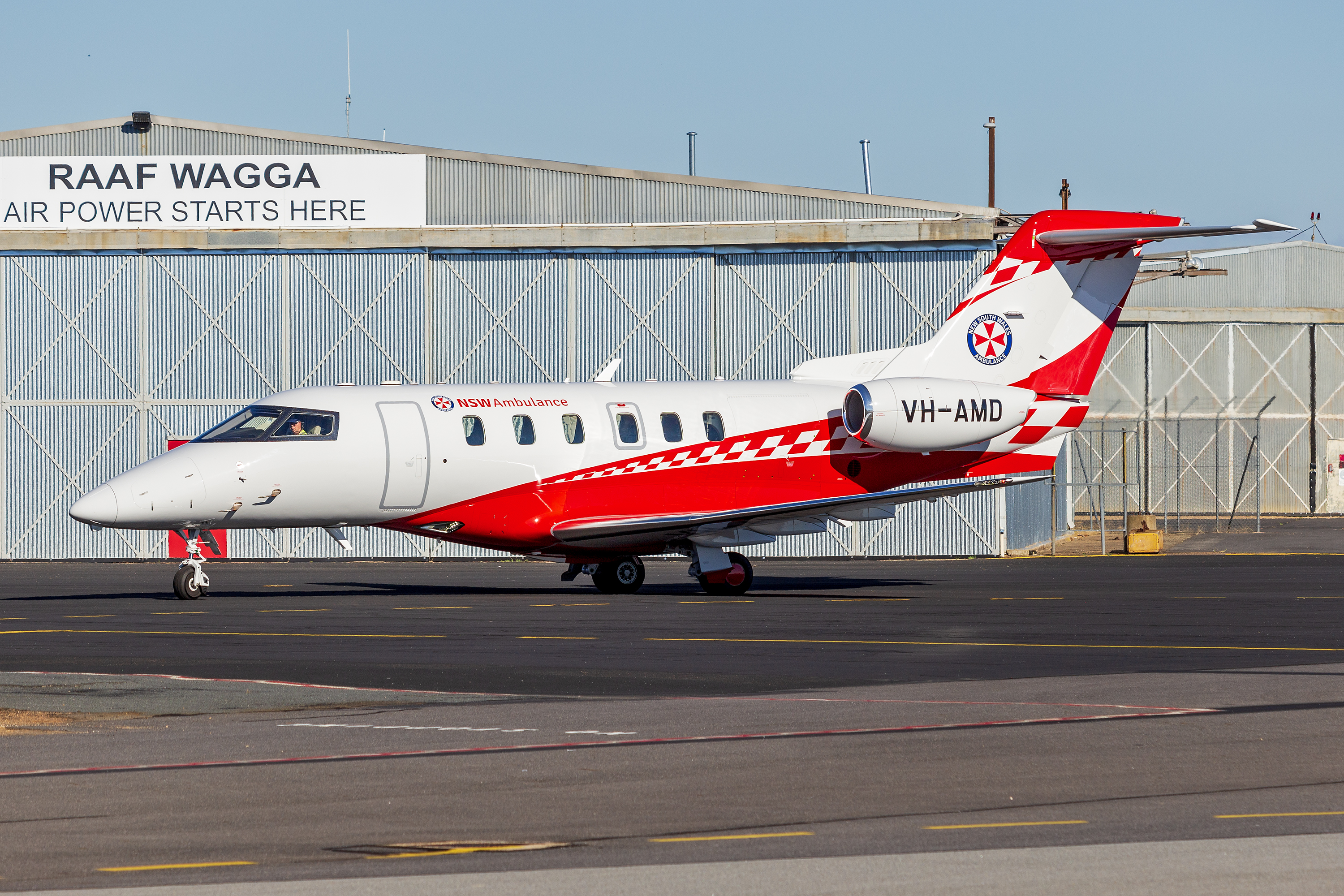
One of two Pilatus PC-24 operated by Pel-Air for NSW Ambulance

The Medical Retrieval Unit (MRU) (through the Rapid Launch Trauma Centre) are responsible for the coordination and response of NSW Ambulance's Medical Retrieval Teams. Each Medical Team consists of a Doctor and a Critical Care Paramedic, who work together to bring the highest level of pre hospital clinical care to patients. Medical Teams can perform a number of complex medical procedures beyond the scope of Primary and Intensive Care Paramedics.

It operates from six bases across NSW, located at Bankstown, Albion Park, Orange, Belmont, Tamworth and Lismore, along with Hume in the Australia Capital Territory. Three further Helicopter bases are being planned in Port Macquarie, Moruya, and Wagga Wagga.

Each Medical Team primarily operates from a specially equipped AgustaWestland AW139 helicopter. Two aircraft operate from Bankstown, with one aircraft attached to each of the other bases. A third helicopter is operated from Bankstown as a Newborn Emergency Transport Service aircraft. Each helicopter aircrew consists of a pilot and a crewman. The teams also have access to a numerous specialist vehicles for road based responses, including Ambulances and 4WD response vehicles. The helicopters are managed and maintained on a contract basis by Toll (Southern Bases) and Westpac(Northern Bases).

An additional medical team is based out of Westmead Hospital in Sydney, who are operated by the not for profit organisation CareFlight. It operates an Airbus H-145 and respond in conjunction with NSW Ambulance's other medical teams across the state.

The Air Ambulance Service also conduct long distance inter hospital patient transport, ensuring the continuation high level medical care between hospitals during transit. Based at Sydney its operates five Beechcraft Super King Air aircraft. Additional Fixed-Wing ambulances also operate in Dubbo and Broken Hill as part of a contract with Royal Flying Doctor Service. In January 2024, two Pilatus PC-24 operated by Pel-Air commenced operating.

== Fleet ==
=== Emergency ambulances ===
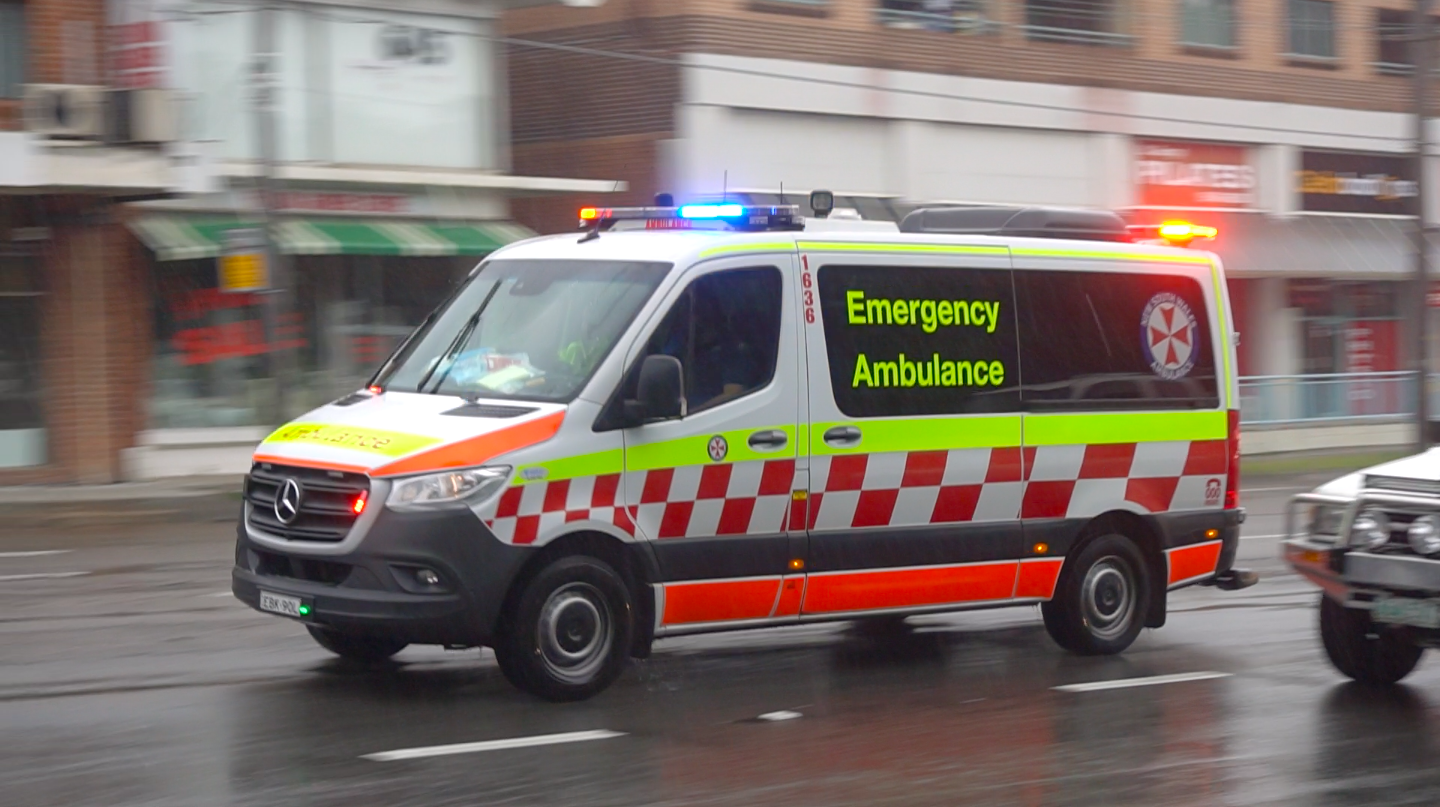
Mercedes-Benz Sprinter ambulance

The primary response vehicle of NSW Ambulance is the Mercedes-Benz Sprinter. Run by both General Duties and Intensive Care crews, Sprinters make up the large majority of the ambulance fleet across the state. A number of rural areas previously used Volkswagen Transporters, but these have now been replaced. Some rural stations also operate Toyota Landcruiser Troopcarriers which are configured for patient transport and are used to access patients in difficult and remote terrain. The Troopcarrier 4WD vehicles have an after market side access door on the left hand side for paramedic access into the treatment cabin.

=== Multi Purpose Vehicles (MPVs) ===
MPVs are large custom built Mercedes Sprinters, which are equipped to deal with large complex bariatric patients. The rear patient transport area of the vehicle is significantly larger than a standard emergency ambulance, and is also equipped with specialist casualty loading and patient management gear, such as mechanical lifting equipment. As well as bariatric patients, the vehicles are also highly beneficial for patients undergoing hospital transfers who require specialist equipment such as life support machines to travel with them in the ambulance.

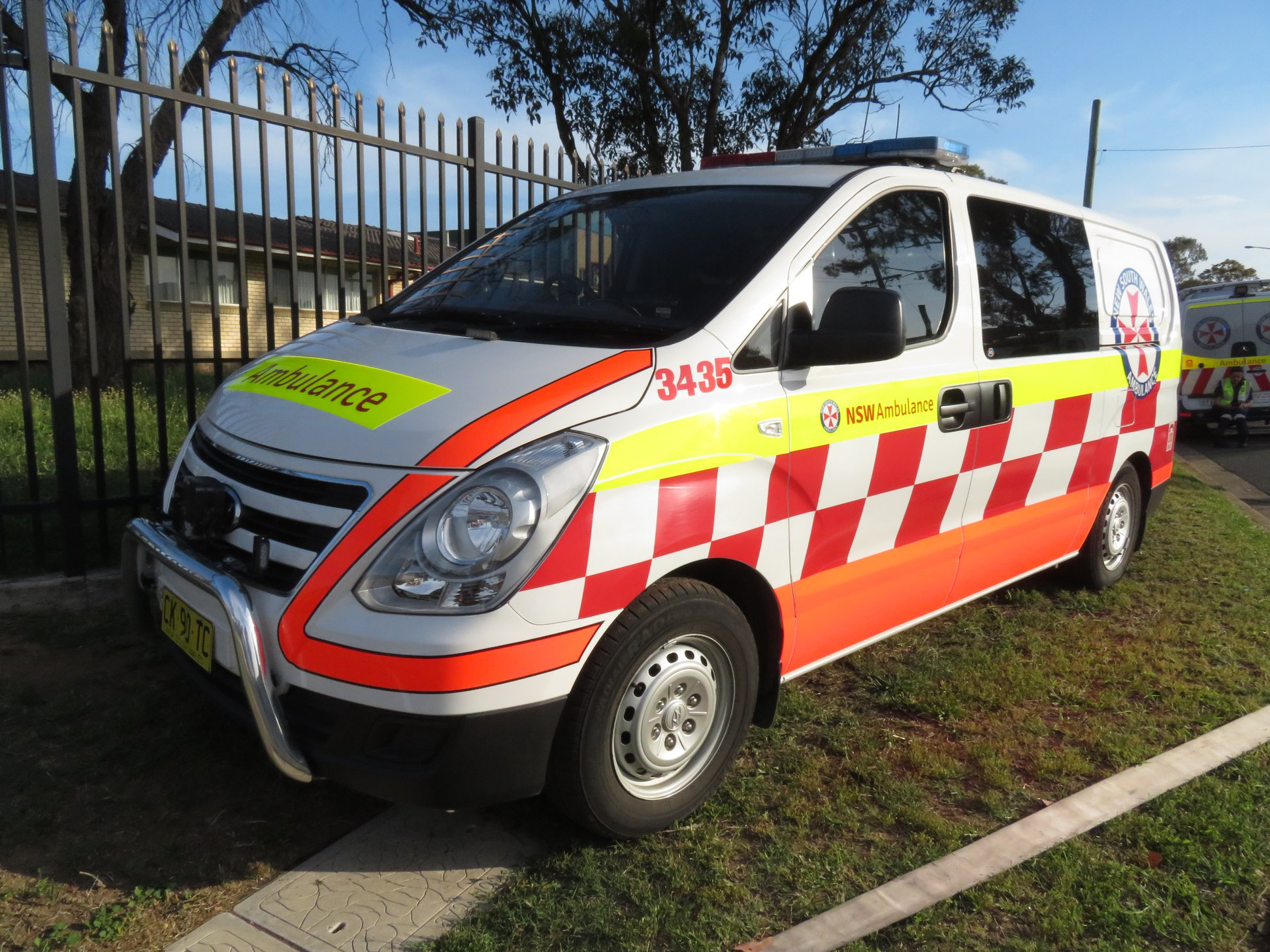
Hyundai iLoad; Extended Care Paramedic

=== Extended Care Paramedics (ECPs) ===
ECPs operate a fleet of Hyundai iLoads and Toyota HiAces which are fitted out with an extensive range of extended care equipment. These vehicles are unable to transport patients, instead they provide extensive specialised treatment to patients on-scene, minimising the number of patient transports to hospital with their significant range of equipment.

=== Paramedic Immediate Care Units (PICUs) ===
PICUs provide rapid response to emergencies across Metropolitan NSW, utilising a range of Holden Captivas, and Kia Sorentos. Staffed with a mix of GD and IC Paramedics, they're able to provide immediate lifesaving care to patients in the busy areas of Sydney and Newcastle. NSW Ambulance also operate three Motorcycles, staffed by IC Paramedics, which are able to negotiate the tight and congested areas of Sydney's inner city.

=== Duty Operations Managers (DOMs) ===
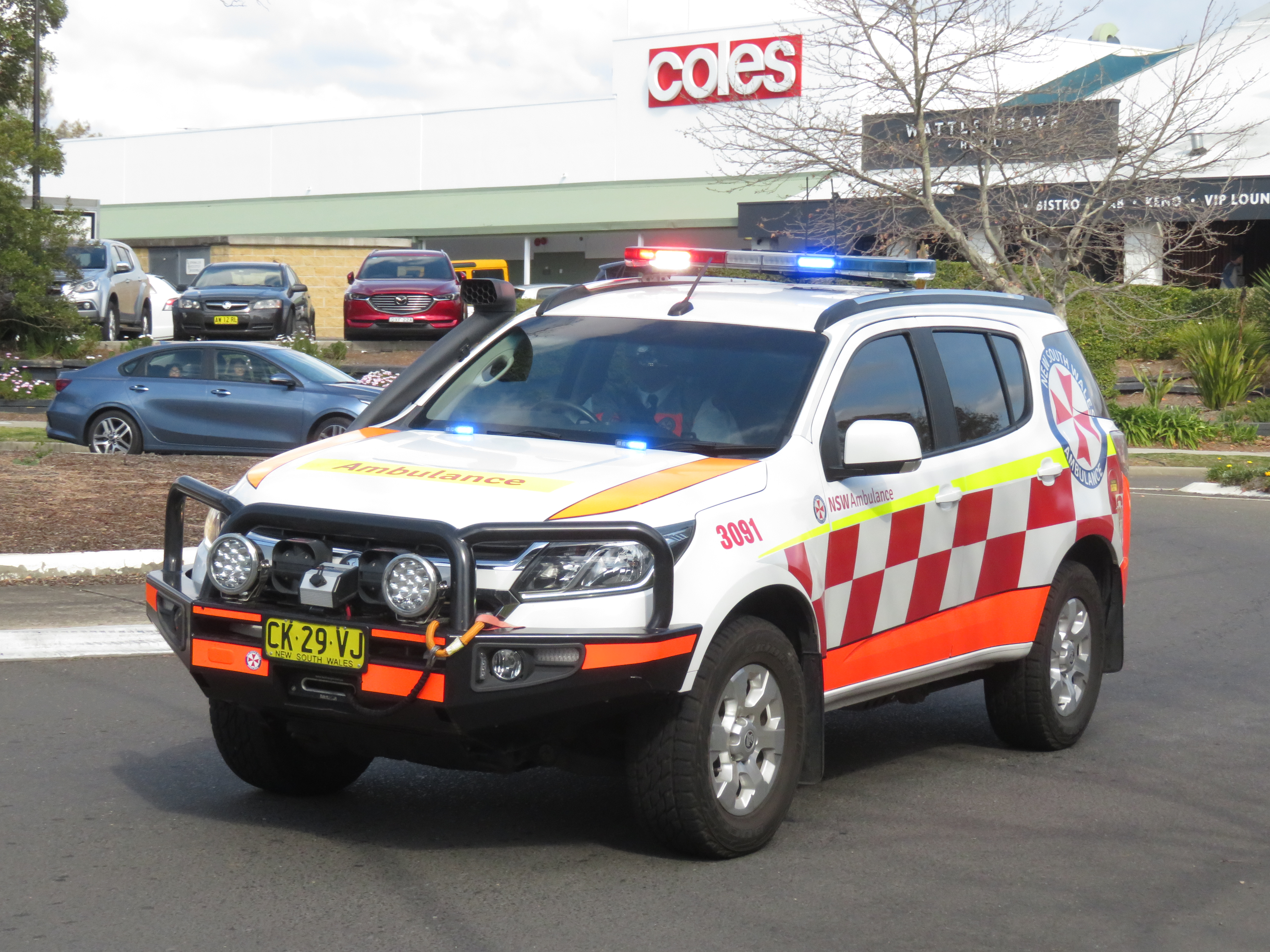
Holden TrailBlazer; Duty Operations Manager

DOMs operate a range of response vehicles, predominantly SUVs and Utilities, which allow them to respond rapidly to incidents and provide immediate on site expertise and oversight. Each vehicle carries an array of medical equipment similar to a PICU, allowing them to perform patient care when required (such as arriving on scene at an incident before an ambulance crew or assisting with multiple patients). The wide fleet of vehicles used by DOMs includes Holden Captivas, Holden Colorados, Holden Trailblazers, Toyota Prados, Isuzu MU-Xs, Isuzu D-Maxs and Kia Sorentos.

=== Over snow vehicles ===
Perisher Valley Ambulance Station operate a fleet of over-snow vehicles, including a Hägglunds all-terrain vehicle, a Kässbohrer Geländefahrzeug over-snow vehicle, two Yamaha snowmobiles, a 4WD quad bike and trailer and a 4WD Mercedes Sprinter, which allow paramedics to access the alpine areas of the Snowy Mountains.

=== Special Operations Team (SOT) ===
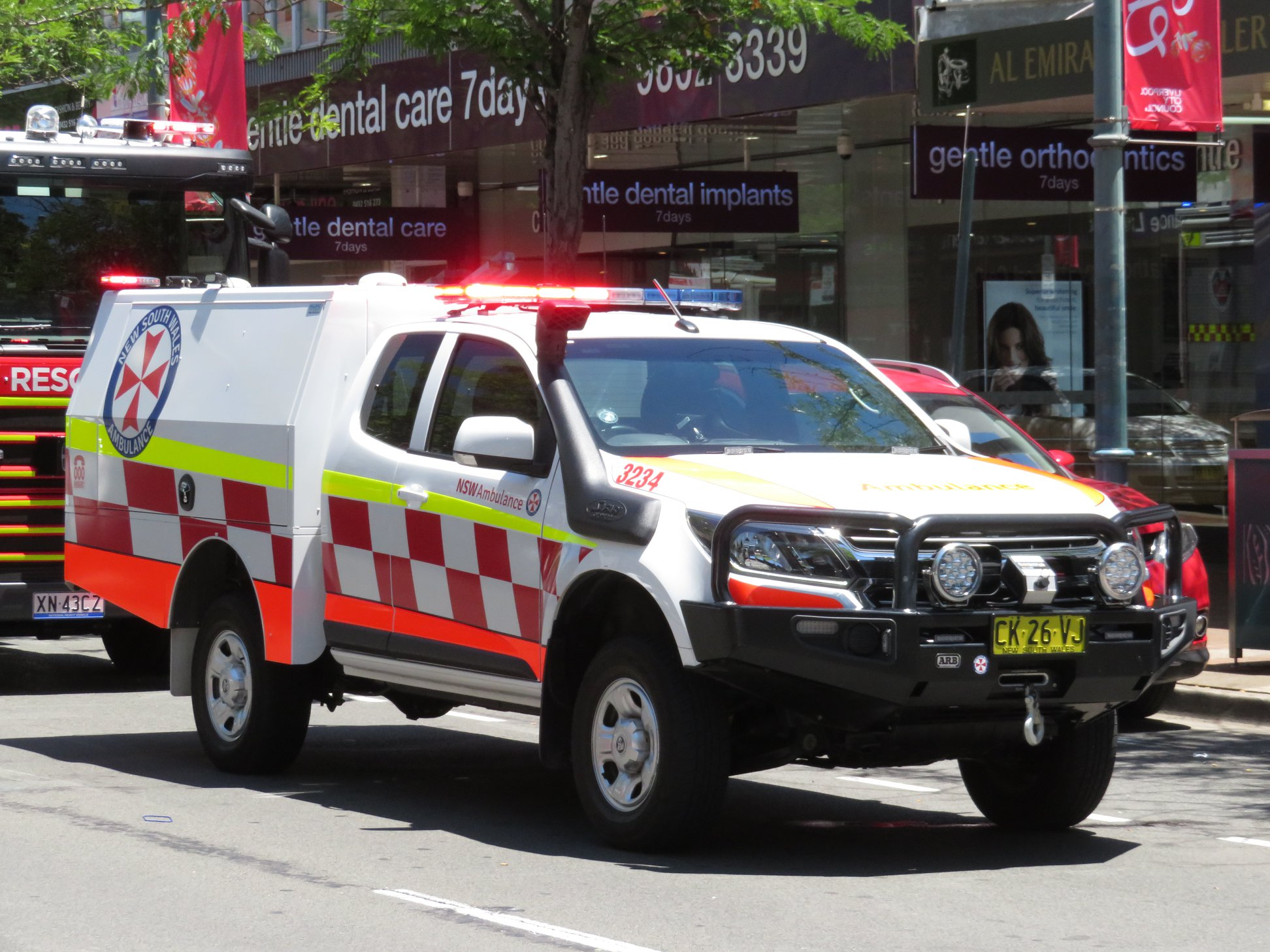
Holden Colorado; Special Operations Team

SOT operate custom built Toyota Hilux utilities as their primary response vehicles, which are fitted out with an equipment pod that allow them to carry specialist equipment such as cordage (rope), harnessing equipment and breathing apparatus. Each vehicle is also fitted out with an array of medical equipment, often featuring the same general duties kits found in emergency ambulances, allowing them to provide treatment to patients. SOT also operate Holden Colorados and Toyota Landcruisers for special operations work such as major incident deployments, which are often double crewed.

They also operate a number of specialist support vehicles from the Special Operations HQ at Homebush including;

– Forward Control Vehicle (Mercedes Sprinter fitted out as a mobile forward command post)

– Rescue Support Vehicle (Mercedes Sprinter fitted out with rescue and extrication gear, often used for training)

– Logistics Support Vehicle (Hino Truck used to carry bulk equipment and medical supplies)

– Major Incident Support Units (Two Mercedes Sprinters with custom bodies fitted out to carry major incident support equipment)

– SOT Multi Purpose Vehicle (Mercedes Sprinter MPV used for special operations)

Each of the six SOT Rescue Units is also assigned a Hino Rescue Truck. Each rescue is equipped with a wide array of rescue and extrication equipment such as forcible entry gear, battery cutting tools and rope rescue gear among other equipment. Each truck also carries a complement of medical equipment similar to SOT Response Vehicles. A seventh Hino Rescue is kept in Sydney as a spare, in addition to the Mercedes support vehicle.

== Control Centres (Triple Zero/Aeromedical) ==
=== Overview ===
NSW Ambulance operates multiple Control Centres strategically located across the state to ensure resilience and continuity of operations. These are located in Charlestown (Northern Control Centre), Sydney (Sydney Control Centre), Warilla (Southern Control Centre) and Dubbo (Western Control Centre). These are supported by a number of backup and disaster recovery sites to maintain service during high-demand periods or technical outages.

=== Functions ===
Control Centres are staffed by specially trained personnel including:

- Communications Assistants (Emergency Medical Call Takers) – who answer 000 emergency calls, triage incidents using the Medical Priority Dispatch System (MPDS), and provide time-critical Dispatch Life Support (DLS) instructions such as CPR guidance or childbirth support.
- Control Centre Officers (Emergency Medical Dispatchers) – who allocate and coordinate the movement of ambulance resources using Computer-Aided Dispatch (CAD) systems like VisiCAD, ensuring timely responses based on case acuity and crew availability.
- Communications Team Leaders (CTL) – who provide oversight of call taker
- Duty Control Centre Officer (DCCO) - DCCOs are responsible for overseeing real-time dispatch operations. They act as the first point of escalation for call takers and dispatchers during operational or clinical complexities, and coordinate responses to time-critical or multi-resource incidents. The DCCO plays a key role in maintaining situational awareness across their allocated region and liaises closely with field staff to manage workload and case flow.
- Senior Control Centre Officer (SCCO) - Provide operational leadership to Duty Control Centre Officers and oversee major incidents, inter-agency coordination, and state-wide resource management. They ensure compliance with operational procedures and clinical protocols, facilitate strategic decision-making during emergencies, and serve as the principal liaison between the control centre and executive command structures. The SCCO holds overarching accountability for operational outcomes during their shift.

=== Technology and Protocols ===
NSW Ambulance Control Centres utilise:

- Advanced Mobile Location (AML) for precise caller geolocation.
- ProQA and MPDS for structured emergency call triage.
- Radio and telephony integration to maintain direct contact with crews.
- CAD interfaces to track unit status, response times, and incident data in real time.

=== Special Operations ===
Control Centres are equipped to handle large-scale incidents, multi-agency coordination, and high-volume call surges, such as during extreme weather events or major public events.

=== Aeromedical Control ===
Aeromedical Control is a specialised division within NSW Ambulance responsible for the coordination and dispatch of helicopter and fixed-wing medical retrieval operations across New South Wales, Australia. Operating 24/7, Aeromedical Control ensures the timely deployment of air assets for both emergency response and inter-hospital patient transfers.

==== Role and Responsibilities ====
Aeromedical Control is staffed by a team of highly trained Control Centre Officers, including Aeromedical Duty Officers (ADOs), who manage:

- Tasking of rotary-wing (helicopter) and fixed-wing aircraft
- Coordination of Critical Care Medical Teams
- Integration with Local Health Districts and NSW Health’s Retrieval Services
- Prioritisation of urgent time-critical missions such as major trauma, cardiac arrest, stroke, neonatal, and ECMO transfers
- Management of logistical, clinical, and aviation considerations including weather, fuel, crew hours, and aircraft capabilities

==== Operations ====
Aeromedical Control is co-located with the broader NSW Ambulance control network but operates with dedicated infrastructure and systems tailored to aviation-based retrievals. It works in partnership with:

- Toll Ambulance Rescue Helicopters
- Westpac Rescue Helicopter Service
- NSW Health’s Aeromedical Retrieval Services (RSNSW)
- NSW Telestroke and NETS (Newborn and Paediatric Emergency Transport Service)

Advanced software platforms are used to track aircraft in real-time, manage mission status, and ensure continuous situational awareness across multiple retrieval bases. Aeromedical Control serves as the central coordinating body for all aeromedical movements, ensuring safety, clinical appropriateness, and operational efficiency across NSW.

== See also ==
- Paramedics in Australia
