= Stuart Diver =

Australian ski instructor

Stuart Diver (born 14 January 1970 in New South Wales, Australia) is a ski instructor and was the sole survivor of the 1997 Thredbo landslide.

== Thredbo landslide ==
At 11.35pm, on 30 July 1997, 3,500 tonnes of rock and mud slid down the side of Thredbo, a ski resort in New South Wales, taking two ski lodges with it. The landslide killed 18 people, one of whom was Diver's first wife, Sally (née Donald). After 3 Days in sub-zero temperatures with only a small blanket and jacket, Diver was finally pulled from the rubble. After the incident, Diver wrote a biography, Survival, with journalist Simon Bouda, detailing his struggles with the experience of the disaster and the aftermath. Diver's experiences were also made into the Australian TV movie, Heroes' Mountain, where his character was played by actor Craig McLachlan.

== Private life ==
Diver has a Bachelor of Applied Science, is a level-three ski instructor and in 2012 he became Operations Manager of the Thredbo Ski Resort. After his wife Sally died in the Thredbo landslide, Stuart remarried. With his wife Rosanna (née Cossettini), Stuart has a daughter, Alessia.

Stuart owns a house above the disaster site, where he lived with his wife Rosanna and Alessia. Rosanna died from breast cancer on 21 March 2015.

Diver has an active role promoting The Salvation Army and is one of the most well-known public faces of the charity. He has a brother Euan, mother Annette and father Steve.
