= Urban Search and Rescue New South Wales AUS-2 =

A USAR vehicle belonging to AUS-02

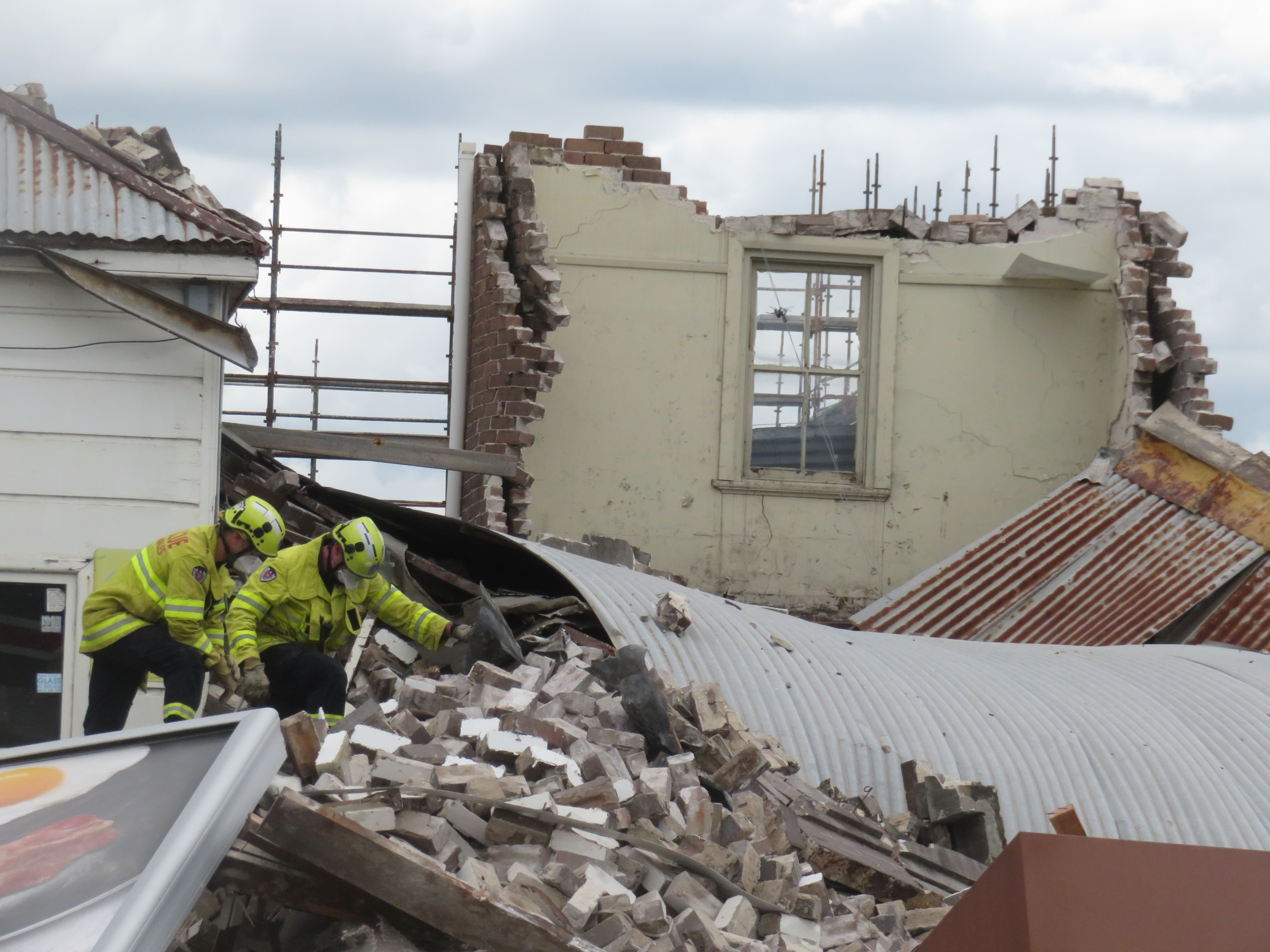
AUS-02 at a major structural collapse in Hurlstone Park in February 2023

New South Wales Urban Search and Rescue Task Force 1 (or NSWTF/1) was first established as a USAR capability in the lead up to the 2000 Sydney Olympics. After earlier large-scale collapses including the 1977 Granville Train Disaster, 1989 Newcastle earthquake and 1997 Thredbo landslide, Fire & Rescue NSW was legislated as the combat authority for responding to major structural collapse incidents within the state of New South Wales.

The Task Force was classified as a Heavy USAR team by the United Nations INSARAG organisation in 2012. When the NSW USAR Task Force is deployed internationally by the Australian Department of Foreign Affairs and Trade, it assumes the call sign "AUS-2" in line with INSARAG guidelines.

The Task Force is based in Sydney, New South Wales (Australia). It is a capability of Fire & Rescue NSW but is staffed by emergency service workers from many federal and state agencies.

Every state of Australia has a local USAR capability. AUS-2 is one of two Task Forces that deploys internationally to provide international response to natural and man-made disasters – AUS-1 is a capability managed by the Queensland Fire Department.

== Capabilities ==
The NSW USAR team can deploy many capabilities within a 6-hour time frame:

- Heavy USAR team
- Medium USAR team
- Disaster Assistance Team (post cyclone)
- Reconnaissance/Forward assessment team
- Medical Assistance Team (logistics support)
- Hazmat response team

== Deployments ==
Various size NSW USAR capabilities have been deployed to disasters around the world. These range from full Classified Heavy USAR teams to small incident management groups:

1977 Granville Train Disaster
1989 Newcastle earthquake
1997 Thredbo landslide Multiple heavy USAR teams
1999 Taiwan earthquake Incident Management
1999 Turkey earthquake Incident Management
2000 Sydney Olympics
2004 Boxing Day tsunami (Indian Ocean)
2006 Indonesia earthquake Logistics support for medical team
2009 Samoa tsunami Logistics support for medical team
2011 Christchurch earthquake Heavy USAR team and component of second Australian Heavy USAR team
2011 Japan earthquake and tsunami Heavy USAR team
2015 Tropical Cyclone Pam, Vanuatu Medium Disaster Assistance Team
2023 2023 Turkey–Syria earthquake Heavy USAR team

== Participating government agencies ==
Fire & Rescue NSW - incident management, logistics, rescue and hazmat
Australian Department of Foreign Affairs - liaison officers
Emergency Management Australia - liaison officers
NSW Police Force - security liaison and canine search teams
NSW Public Works - structural engineers
NSW Health - doctors and medical cache
NSW Ambulance - paramedics
