= NSW SES Bush Search and Rescue =

- Formation: 27 November 1936; 89 years ago
- Location: Sydney, New South Wales, Australia

NSW SES Bush Search and Rescue (SES BSAR) (previously known as Bush Search and Rescue NSW, Bushwalkers Wilderness Rescue Squad (BWRS) and Bushwalkers Search and Rescue (B S&R) is a remote and rugged area land search and rescue service in New South Wales, Australia established on 27 November 1936. NSW SES Bush Search and Rescue is a wholly volunteer operated, specialist squad of the NSW State Emergency Service.

The squad was formed based on the premise that the best people to search for missing bushwalkers are experienced bushwalkers, who are expected to understand the bush, to know how to navigate in difficult terrain, and to know the hidden passes and the common mistakes walkers make while trying to find a route in difficult country. These days NSW SES Bush Search and Rescue searches not only for bushwalkers but also for elderly missing persons, despondent persons and victims of crime.

== History ==
=== Testing the concept: 1932 ===
Prior to formation of the Bushwalker Search and Rescue Section in November 1936, various bushwalking clubs realised the need for an organised search and rescue capability. A search exercise was held in 1932 by members of the Sydney Bush Walkers and Mountain Trails Club looking for three lost walkers near the Royal National Park. The lost walkers were located by their distress signal of three smoky fires even though the day was misty. There was a boom in bushwalking during the 1930s so a need for an adequate search and rescue response was identified.

=== Formation: 1936 ===
During early 1936, Ninian Melville of The New South Wales Federation of Bushwalking Clubs proposed that the federation form a "Topographic Bureau" that could provide walking information and to "record particulars of persons who would be available in cases of emergency for search and rescue parties." Ninian was transferred to the country before this idea could be implemented. Despite this, an event was soon to catalyze the formation of a Search and Rescue Section of the Federation.

On Saturday 3 October 1936, four young men set off to walk from Govetts Leap at Blackheath to Richmond via the Grose Valley. The men took only enough food for three days as they were certain they would make Richmond by then. A track was followed for the first two days but on the third day the track became hard to spot and the men encountered heavy vegetation. On the fourth day heavy rain soaked the men and on the fifth day the men decided to split up: two would push on ahead and the other two would continue at their own pace behind. Later that day, one of the lagging men, fatigued and out of food, could walk no further and decided to stay in a cave whilst the other would speed up and catch up with leading pair. On the sixth day this man caught up to the leading pair but after encountering thick scrub and not having eaten for 30 hours one of the three men could not continue and camped in a cave whilst the remaining two pressed on. Later that evening, a search party from Richmond had found the two walking men about 10 miles from Richmond and 20 miles from Blackheath. The search team and located men then proceeded back together to the second cave to pick up the man resting there by evening. The young man in the first cave was picked up by the group around 10:00 am on the seventh day.

Search participants included police, bushwalkers and other civilians. Immediately after the search, a team of bushwalkers that were involved in the search including Paddy Pallin, suggested that a Search and Rescue group be established in what appeared to be a move to deploy experienced bushwalker teams much faster into the field than what had traditionally been done. NSW Police agreed that a more organised and coordinated response to missing persons in the bush was needed using people with specialised knowledge and skills. A sub-committee consisting of Paddy Pallin (Convener), Robert Savage (Assistant Convener), Herb Freeman, Tom Herbert and Bill Holesgrove was formed in 1936 and met several times prior to the formal establishment of the Search and Rescue Section.

The Search and Rescue Section was formally established on 27 November 1936 when The New South Wales Federation of Bushwalking Clubs concluded at a committee meeting that a Search and Rescue Section was acceptable and unanimously moved that the section "should be empowered to act on its own initiative" rather than as a sub-committee of the Federation.

Preliminary organisation was completed by February 1937 with a "loosely organised unit" established and the Commissioner of Police was informed of the unit. The unit was "subsequently called out on many occasions" and seemed to have a high success rate at locating lost bushwalkers. This unit was called the Bushwalker Search and Rescue Section; the birth of the present day Bush Search and Rescue New South Wales.

=== Affiliation with the VRA: 1970 ===
The Volunteer Rescue Association (VRA) was formed as an oversight organisation to ensure standardisation of equipment and practices amongst the many community raised rescue squads in NSW. Bushwalkers Search and Rescue Section affiliated with the VRA in 1970.

=== Incorporation: 2001 ===
By 2000, changing times prompted the subcommittee to form into an incorporated entity, with more highly trained membership (requiring specialist skills to effectively work with other search agencies). On 16 February 2001 Bushwalkers Search and Rescue (B S&R) became an incorporated association and renamed to Bushwalkers Wilderness Rescue Squad (BWRS).

=== Change of name: 2017 ===
To better reflect the roles performed, on 14 March 2017 Bushwalkers Wilderness Rescue Squad (BWRS) was renamed to Bush Search and Rescue New South Wales Incorporated (BSAR NSW).

=== A NSW SES unit: 2018 ===
During April 2018, BSAR NSW members voted to cease affiliation with the Volunteer Rescue Association and register as a NSW State Emergency Service (SES) specialist unit, reporting to State Headquarters. On 1 May 2018 the 'NSW SES Bush Search and Rescue Unit' was activated.

== Capability ==
=== Remote Land Search ===
The NSW SES Bush Search and Rescue Unit specialises in remote and rugged land Search and Rescue (SAR) with the ability to operate in steep terrain and thick vegetation well away from command posts and base locations. The squad normally works under the coordination of NSW Police and works closely with NSW Police Rescue. Less demanding Land SAR duties in areas such as urban fringes can also be performed.

=== 72 hours unassisted ===
Unless advised otherwise, NSW SES Bush Search and Rescue Unit Field Members (search team members) must arrive at a search with the ability to deploy away from base in the field and search for 72 hours without resupply. This is a significant capability for the Search and Rescue Mission Coordinator (SMC) to have at hand.

=== Organic radio communications ===
The NSW SES Bush Search and Rescue Unit is a long term user of High Frequency (HF) radio which allows communications from effectively any location in the bush. HF radio does not require line of sight between the search team and Command Post and has proven more reliable than satellite phones in the BSAR operating environment. HF radio also provides an instant 'day one' radio network by simply setting up a Command Post radio and issuing HF units to search teams.

SES BSAR also utilise a number of other radio communication devices based upon terrain and situation. These include SES standard issue PSN-capable radios (which include UHF, VHF, simplex and analog options) as well as satellite phones and two-way satellite communication devices such as the Garmin inReach. These offer increased situational awareness, safety and secure communications to the Commander.

=== Remotely Piloted Aircraft Systems (RPAS) ===
During November 2014, BSAR NSW became one of the first operators in Australia of a RPAS (Drone) at an official land search operation. The RPAS significantly reduced search time of cliff areas and decreased human risk exposure. Since then BSAR NSW has used the industry knowledge of its members to test and develop a safe and efficient RPAS capability. Simple RPAS can be employed by BSAR NSW in exposed cliff areas in many areas of NSW away from aerodromes to increase search efficiency and maximise search resources. However, since leaving the VRA and joining the NSW State Emergency Service, drone use is currently on hold pending SES policy.

=== Leadership ===
NSW SES Bush Search and Rescue Unit Commanders and Team Leaders offer solid leadership, command and control skills to the SMC. These members can be used to lead multi-agency teams in remote land SAR operations or to coordinate search operations.

== NavShield ==
Every year the NSW SES Bush Search and Rescue Unit organises and runs the Australian Emergency Services Wilderness Navigation Shield or NavShield event. Participants test their bush and compass navigation abilities in an overnight event through 100 km^{2} of wilderness terrain a few hours drive from Sydney, Australia. The location of the event is different each year. This is an important training event for NSW emergency services.

== Joining ==
=== Field Members ===
Field members are required to have map and compass back country navigation skills and adequate multi-day off-track bushwalking experience prior to joining BSAR. They must also complete a multi-day induction walk in moderate topography to demonstrate bush skills, bush fitness and teamwork skills. The onus is on the member to bring with him/her solid bush skills so BSAR can focus on search and rescue training.
