= 1997 Thredbo landslide =

Alpine disaster in New South Wales, Australia

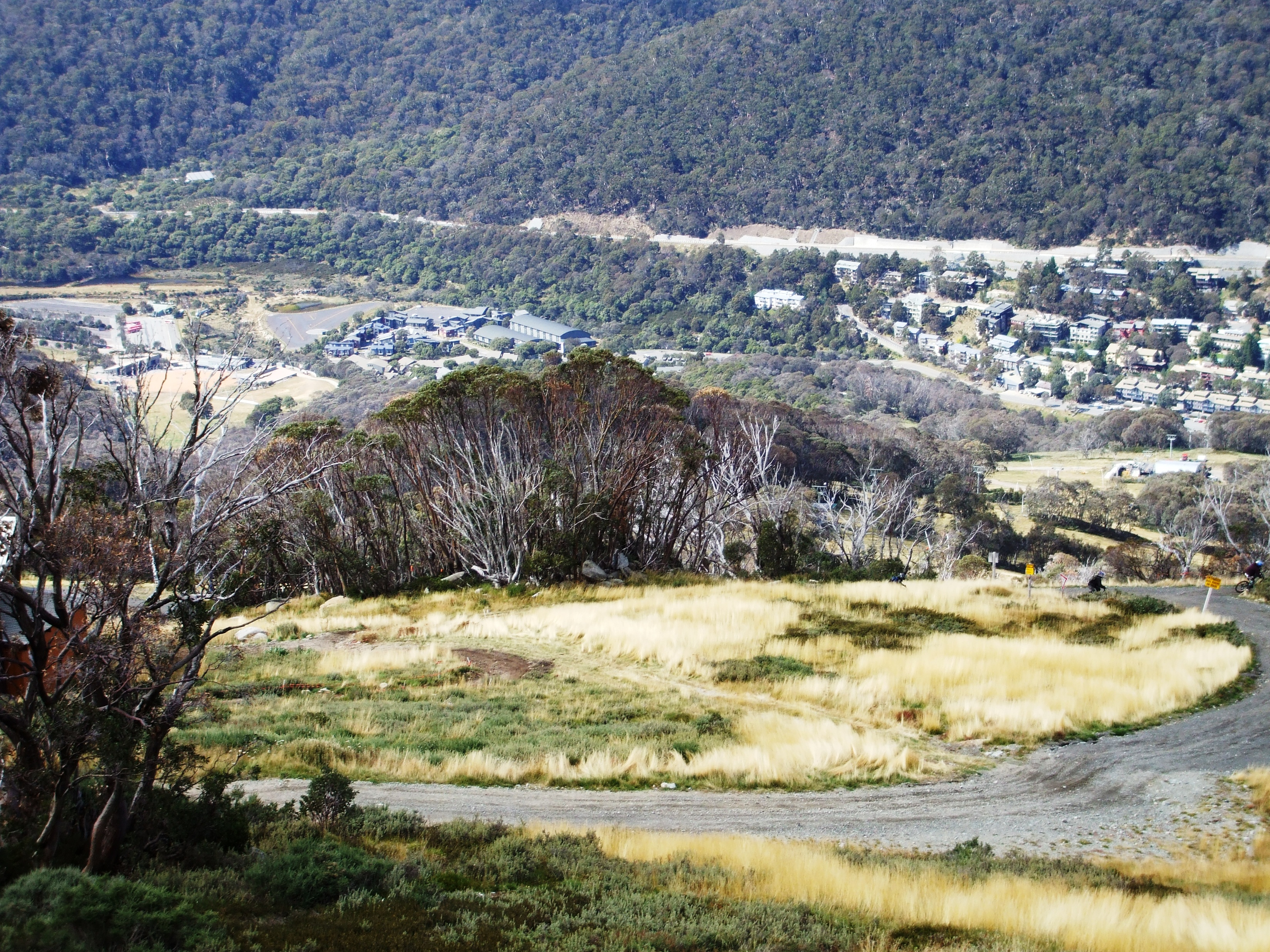
- Thredbo village and ski resort with Alpine Way road seen running above the lodges (Summer 2008)
- Date: 30 July 1997
- Time: 11:40 pm
- Location: Thredbo, New South Wales, Australia; 36°30′13″S 148°18′31″E
- Cause: Heavy rain, melting snow and a leaking water main. It was also noted that the original planted, willow trees that had held back the slope had been removed by the parks authority as noted in various newspaper reports at the time of the disaster, which contributed to liquefaction of the ground soil. The landslide was caused by liquification of the soil after heavy rain (and snow melt) and lack of appropriate soil stabilisation measures being implemented prior to the disaster.
- Deaths: 18

The Thredbo landslide was a catastrophic landslide that occurred at the village and ski resort of Thredbo, New South Wales, Australia, on 30 July 1997. Two ski lodges were destroyed and 18 people died. Stuart Diver was the only survivor.

== Landslide ==
At 11:40 pm on Wednesday, 30 July 1997, a landslide destroyed the Bimbadeen and Carinya Lodges at the Thredbo Alpine Village in New South Wales. Thousands of tonnes of liquefied earth and debris slid down the slope above the town.

The four-storey Carinya Lodge (owned by the Brindabella Ski Club) was torn in two. The landslide destroyed the support for Alpine Way road, which then collapsed, and sheared the western half of Carinya from its foundations. The detached structure slid downhill and crossed Bobuck Lane before colliding with the Bimbadeen Ski Lodge at high speed, destroying both. The landslide and debris continued downhill to hit the Bimbadeen Staff Lodge, which also collapsed. Witnesses reported hearing "a whoosh of air, a crack and a sound like a freight train rushing down the hill". John Cameron, a member of Brindabella Ski Club, who was alone in Carinya, along with 17 residents in Bimbadeen, lost their lives.

Within 10-20 minutes of the landslide, New South Wales Fire Brigades Communication Centre at Wollongong received emergency calls from the lodge at Thredbo. The local fire brigades responded to reports of a 'small explosion' in the village. The first report to come through said that 100 people had been trapped.

Police arrived at 12:30 am and evacuated the area. A regional disaster was declared, with Goulburn established as the disaster coordination centre for the region, with Sydney also notified. Medical staff were sent from nearby areas Cooma to Thredbo, and also from Canberra to Jindabyne, which was a point for triage. Four specialists were flown from St George Hospital in Sydney to Thredbo. By 2:30 am, there were 100 professional services on the scene, and many volunteers from the Volunteer Rescue Association (VRA) of New South Wales, the State Emergency Service (SES) of New South Wales, the Australian Red Cross, and other rescue organizations.

=== Thursday, 31 July ===
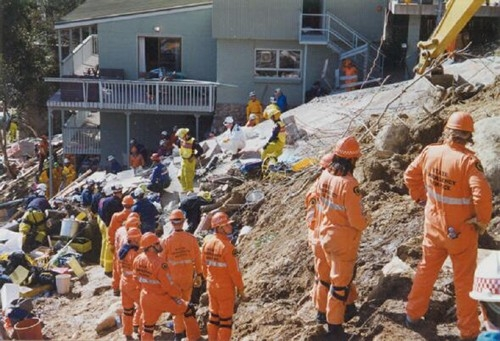
SES volunteers (orange) and firemen (yellow) assist at the Thredbo debris slope, 1997

At 7:30 am, a forward medical command post was established, set up in a lodge located 50 metres (164 feet) from the site of the disaster.

Inspector Rory O'Driscoll of the NSW Police arrived at 8:15 am. At 10:00 am, geophysicists who had been flown to the area from Sydney declared that the site was safe enough to begin an excavation of the top layers. However, it was still very unstable with a now-exposed underground stream flowing through the debris at the rate of 6,120 litres per hour. At 10:30 am, a medical team inspected the disaster site. Many of the rescue workers themselves required treatment of minor injuries and the medical team realised they had to prepare to treat exhaustion and hypothermia among the workers.

The first body was found at 4:20 pm and pulled out at 8:50 pm. At 6:30 pm, a second specialist medical team arrived from Royal North Shore Hospital. The State Emergency Service rotated amongst 1,350 rescue workers, with about 250 on the site at any one time. They worked in shifts of two hours, followed by four hours' rest.

As they worked, attempts were made to reinforce the area to prevent further landslides.

The slope of the hillside, which ranged from 22-40 degrees and the sub-zero Celsius temperatures made rescue efforts difficult. By midnight, 24 hours after the landslide had occurred, only the first body had been discovered. During the night, the temperature at Thredbo dropped to −14 °C (7 °F).

=== Friday, 1 August ===
On 1 August, one more body was discovered in the early morning, and two more later during the day. However these bodies could not be retrieved at the time due to the instability of the rocks. A large slab of concrete which had been part of the Bimbadeen carpark made rescue efforts difficult. At 3:00 pm, doctors met the relatives of the missing.

During the day, several environmental issues were identified such as water and sewerage being cut off to the site, and some diesel fuel seeping into Thredbo Creek.

Rescue workers announced on Friday that there was little hope in finding any survivors. They had not completely given up hope, but Assistant Police Commissioner Ken Moroney told reporters; "I think at this stage the chances are quite remote."

At this time there were no signs of life from fibre optic cameras or thermal imaging.

== Stuart Diver ==
At 5:37 am on 2 August, digging finished and rescue workers dropped sound equipment into a hole they had been digging, as was the standard procedure. This time, they detected some movement underneath the concrete slab.

Five minutes later, rescue expert firefighter Steve Hirst, who used monitoring equipment to confirm the movement, yelled out "Rescue team working overhead, can anyone hear me?" to which a voice called back "I can hear you." When asked if he had sustained any injuries, the voice replied "No, but my feet are bloody cold!"

He was identified as 27-year-old ski instructor Stuart Diver. A device called a trapped-person locater was lowered down, it had a microphone and speaker so that the rescuers could maintain contact with Diver. A pipe was passed down the gap to provide warmer air which would increase his low body temperature. Another tube was put down which carried fluids from which he could have two sips every 20 minutes.

Hirst explained to the press that Diver said he was uninjured, just extremely cold. Police Superintendent Charlie Sanderson explained the difficulty of extracting Diver because they could not risk the concrete slab falling on top of him.

His position was two metres below the surface, beneath three concrete slabs. He was lying in water, wearing only a pair of underpants. Due to the risk of the overlying concrete crushing Diver, rescuers began digging a tunnel 16 metres (52 ft) long from the eastern side of the slope. Five hours later, rescuers had removed enough of the rubble for them to be able to touch Diver. Paul Featherstone was the paramedic who kept talking to Diver for 11 hours until he was freed. When the site had to be evacuated each time the rubble shifted, Featherstone would stay below ground to keep Diver talking and distract him.

Diver was pulled from the wreckage later in the evening around 5:10 pm, with frostbitten feet: he was transported to Canberra Hospital for his recovery. His first words were as he breathed the pure mountain air, "That sky's fantastic!". He was trapped for 65 hours in a small space between two concrete slabs beside the body of his wife, Sally. Sally was a reservations manager at the resort. She had died by drowning as a concrete beam had pinned her in a depression that had filled with water overnight.

The rescue effort continued after Diver had been found, now that rescue workers had hope that there would be more survivors. They did not find any, and the last body was recovered on the following Thursday 7 August. According to a diary that a then AFP officer kept during the rescue, the snow and rain only started after the final body was recovered.

== Aftermath ==
After the landslide, the NSW Fire Brigade expanded its urban search and rescue division.

In 1998, three terraces with gabions and reinforced fill were constructed on the site and the Alpine Way was rebuilt with upslope retaining walls. The site along with a section of the Alpine Way is now monitored with 25 inclinometers, to detect any slope movement, and 12 piezometers, to keep track of water flow in the soil.

Brindabella Ski Club opened its new lodge on 5 June 2004.

The Coroner's report released on 29 June 2000 said that the landslide was caused by water from heavy rain, melting snow and a leaking water main. The landslide hit an eastern wing of one of the lodges first, which caused the nearby land to collapse onto lodges below. The Coroner also noted that there had been landslides prior to July 1997 and that these prior landslides should have warranted action from the relevant authorities. Another of the coroner's recommendations was that an independent body be established to assess the National Parks and Wildlife Service's ability to maintain roads within its national parks. NSW Environment Minister Bob Debus accepted this suggestion and addressed the NSW Parliament with his plan to do so.

As of December 2004, the State Government of New South Wales spent $40 million in out-of-court settlements with 91 businesses and individuals after the incident.

On 2 December 2004, the Supreme Court judgment blamed the leaking water main pipe and the Alpine Way, which was built on a road full of debris, as the cause of the disaster. Soil creep had caused the main to fracture, which had saturated the already unstable slope that supported the road above Carinya. This verdict allowed the unsettled civil case of Bernd Josef and Tricia Hecher to go forward.

The Alpine Way had originally been built as a temporary construction access road by the Snowy Mountains Hydroelectric Authority during the 1950s to access the Murray-1 and Murray-2 hydroelectric power stations constructed as part of the Snowy Mountains Scheme. Once the power stations were completed, the Authority upgraded the road with fill and planted vegetation on the downhill hillside. They transferred ownership to what was then called the State Park and is now Kosciuszko National Park, managed by the National Parks and Wildlife Service (NPWS). NPWS had inadequate funds to maintain many of the park roads especially those which were "not designed for the purpose to which they were later put". Following the disaster, responsibility for the Alpine Way and Kosciuszko Road was handed to the Roads & Traffic Authority (RTA).

A memorial service was held in 2007 to mark the tenth anniversary of the events, which included a flare run down the mountain after sunset. Another memorial was conducted on the 20th anniversary in 2017.

A fact-based made-for-TV drama, Heroes' Mountain, was released in 2002. Craig McLachlan starred as Stuart Diver, with Tom Long and Anthony Hayes co-starring.

== See also ==
- List of disasters in Australia by death toll
