= Community first responder =

A Community first responder (CFR), is a person available to be dispatched by an ambulance control centre to attend medical emergencies in their local area. They can be members of the public, who have received training in life-saving interventions such as defibrillation, off duty paramedics, nurses or medical doctors, or indeed professionals from a non-medical discipline who may be nearby or attending emergencies, such as firefighters. Community first responders are found in the emergency healthcare systems of Canada, United Kingdom, the United States, Ireland, Israel, Italy, Australia, Singapore, New Zealand, and Romania.

== Role ==
Community first responders are there to provide assistance to those with a medical emergency, and most importantly to start and maintain the chain of survival in cardiac arrest patients until a fully equipped ambulance arrives. The schemes were originally envisaged for rural areas where emergency medical services response is likely to be delayed beyond the approximate 8–10 minutes during which a cardiac arrest is likely to become irreversible. The schemes have since expanded to more populous areas, where the benefit of early intervention can still prove life-saving, and the volume of people available to ambulance control assists them with meeting response time targets such as ORCON. They enable faster prehospital response times and help services meet response time targets. A community first responder-led falls prevention service in Lincolnshire led to 870 fewer ambulance call-outs.

A UK review found that first responders were more likely to attend the scene of an incident before an ambulance in rural areas, for neurological conditions including stroke, and for heart and breathing problems. Callers who were less likely to be seen by a community first responder ahead of an ambulance were from minority ethnic backgrounds and lower income areas.

Examples of first responders include "co-responders" (police or fire service), members of staff of a shopping mall or other public place, members of a first aid organisation, lifeguards, community first responders, and others who have been trained to act in this capacity. Employees of the statutory ambulance services may also act as first responders whilst off-duty.

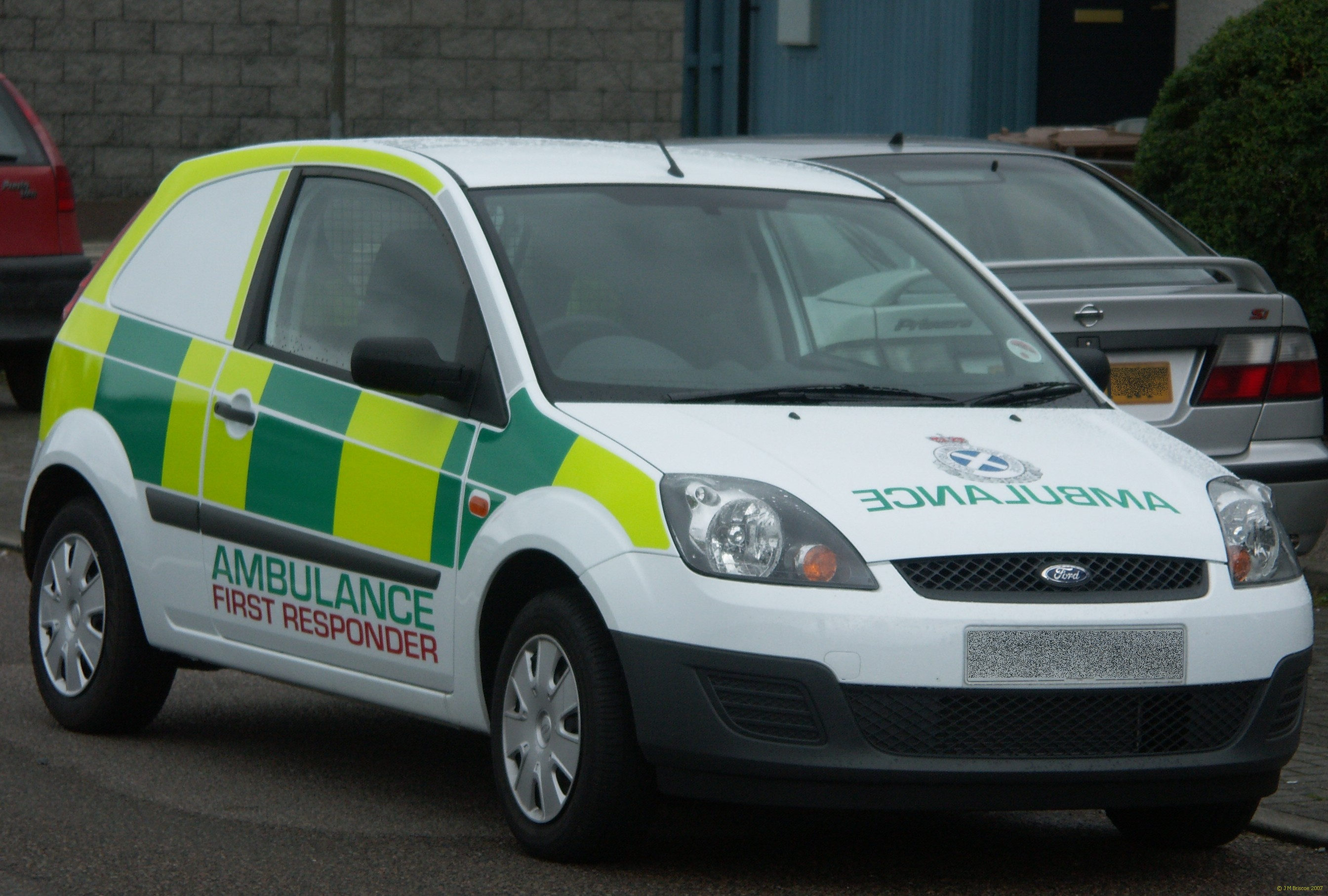
Scottish Ambulance Service "First Responder" vehicle pictured in 2006

== Operations ==
In general, first responders are sent to immediately life-threatening situations such as cardiac arrest. Some ambulance services restrict the type of calls which responders can attend, either through blanket prohibition or by more detailed call screening by the emergency dispatch centre. This is because responders do not necessarily have the levels of training or equipment available to full-time staff, and may arrive on their own, increasing risks. Types of call which responders may not be asked to attend (or be stood down if already en route) include drugs related problems, domestic violence and abusive patients as well as dangerous scenes such as traffic collisions or building sites. In some areas, responders are also not dispatched to paediatric cases, although other areas have this as a main part of their role.

Schemes vary in the UK and are mostly managed by the local ambulance service, although some schemes are run externally (such as by St John Ambulance, or by commercial entities such as Alton Towers) in association with the ambulance service. The majority of responders are volunteers and take no payment (although in some areas, payments are made for each call, particularly to staff responders) and use their own cars with no mileage recompense.

In most schemes, they are expected to drive under normal road traffic laws, and are not permitted to claim exemptions or use blue lights and sirens (as a matter of policy, rather than legal restriction). There are a small number of schemes which have dedicated response cars and responders, who have been fully trained in response driving, respond on blue lights and sirens. In most cases funding for these schemes is from charitable donations from local communities.

== Training ==
The training is generally first aid-based and at its core but includes extended first aid skills such as defibrillation and oxygen therapy. Other topics include roles & responsibilities, scene safety, communication, patient assessment, management of minor trauma and a range of other medical conditions such as diabetes and strokes. Most schemes also use some further extended skills adjuncts, not normally taught on public first aid courses, such as suction and placement of oropharyngeal airways.

There is no nationally agreed standard for the training of community first responders. Some ambulance services choose to use the IHCD First Person on Scene (FPOS) qualification at either basic, intermediate or enhanced levels, however some ambulance services choose to deliver their own syllabus. In most cases, the training takes place over several evenings and/or weekends and involves assessment by a trained paramedic. There may be a period of supervision for new responders including ambulance observation shifts before they are deemed competent to respond on their own. The National Association of Community First Responders was formed in 2014, with the purpose of helping to bring about a national standard for CFRs in the UK.
