= Mounted search and rescue =

Specialty within search and rescue

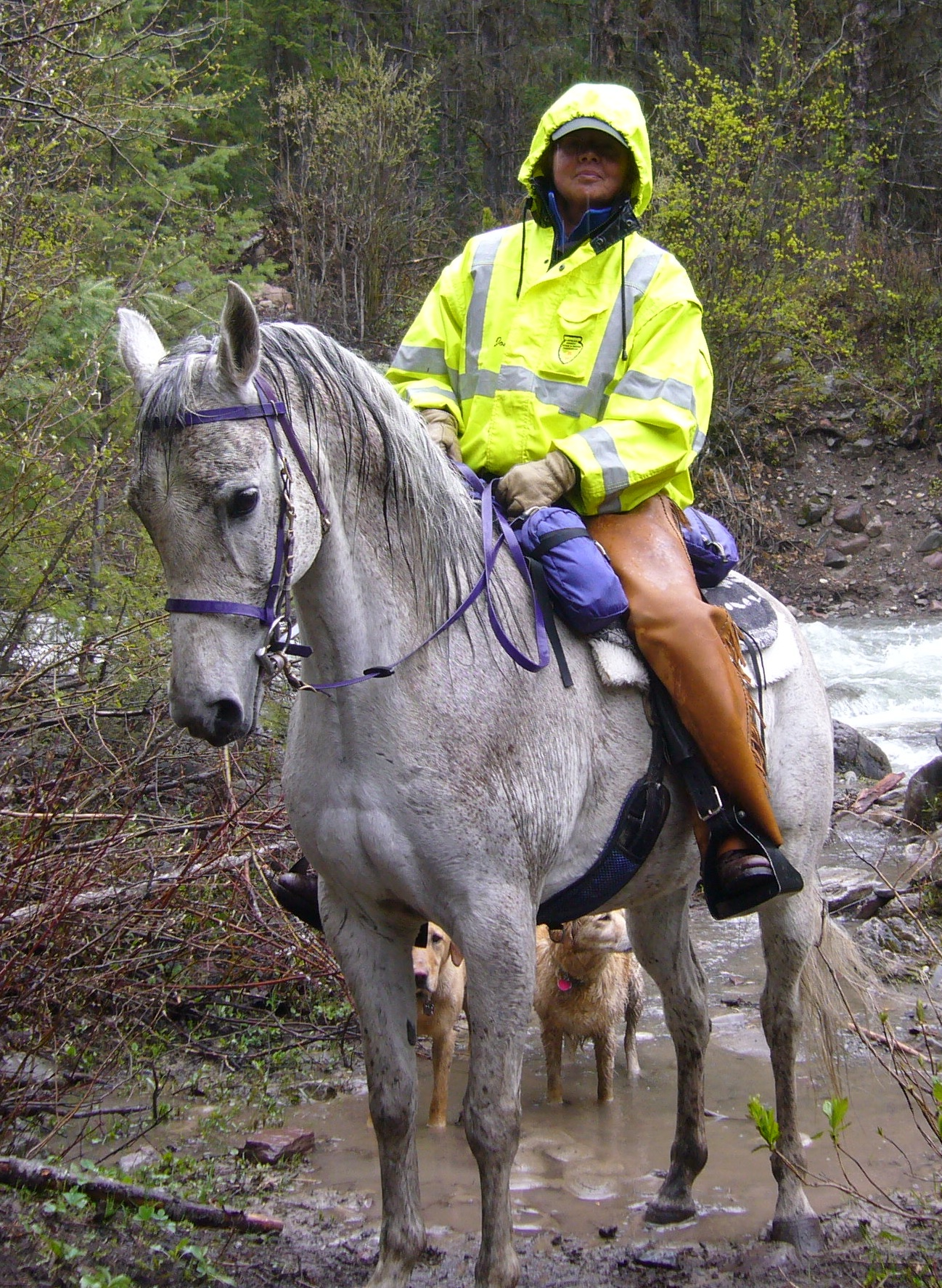
Team rider, horse, dogs

Mounted search and rescue (MSAR) is a specialty within search and rescue (SAR), using horses as search partners and for transportation to search for missing persons. SAR responders on horseback are primarily a search resource, but also can provide off-road logistics support and transportation. Mounted SAR responders can in some terrains move faster on the ground than a human on foot, can transport more equipment, and may be physically less exhausted than a SAR responder performing the same task on foot. Mounted SAR responders typically have longer initial response times than groundpounder SAR resources, due to the time required to pick up trailer, horse(s), and perhaps also water, feed, and equipment.

== Organization ==
Principally volunteer units exist in the United States, Canada, Australia, Germany, and Iceland.

In the United States, many counties have specially deputized, usually volunteer, mounted search and rescue groups. Some of these groups date from World War II. Across the United States, SAR groups are in the process of organizing themselves into associations, usually within states. Formal guidelines for MSAR have been established in several states: California, New Mexico, Maine, Maryland, and Virginia. International standards for the mounted searcher have been developed through the ASTM F32 committee for Search and Rescue.

In Germany, the voluntary humanitarian association Johanniter-Unfall-Hilfe (JUH) recently begun establishing local and regional groups that provide first responder services on horseback. These are modeled after the road-based first aid service of the JUH, except that the horse provides for off-road travel. The first group, established in March 2001 in Harburg, adopted standards of the Deutsche Reiterliche Vereinigung (FN) for first responders at equestrian field sporting events. In 2008, there were 8 groups. Around the same time the German Red Cross briefly recognized a group with a similar function.

== Search and rescue animals ==
A search and rescue horse is a horse trained and used to perform mounted search and rescue. In many cases, the horse is simply a means of transportation for a SAR responder. In other cases, the horse is a full member of the SAR field team. Like a SAR dog, a SAR horse can be trained to search for lost persons, using its keen senses of hearing, scenting, and vision. In addition, some mounted SAR responders work a SAR dog from horseback.

== Search ==
The primary role of Mounted SAR is in the "search" capacity. Riders and horses are normally trained to safely and effectively perform the search function. Riders have training as searchers that includes the detection and protection of clues that may lead to locating the missing person. The mounts used are expected to be calm and reliable.

=== "Look where the horse looks" ===
A common training for searchers mounted on equine is "Look where the horse looks." While there is training available to have the horse or mule perform similarly to a SAR Dog, the majority of Mounted SAR equine and their riders do not have this training. However, the equine's natural senses and behavior are valuable during a search, without particular training, making that animal a viable search partner for clue detection. The horse or mule exhibits behavior to indicate noting "something" as part of that animal's natural behavior, and the rider determines if the equine may have noted the presence of a person who may be the missing person, or a clue that might help lead to that person.

=== Tracking from the saddle ===
Some Mounted SAR riders have additional training specific to searching for clues from the saddle. This valuable skill allows the mounted searcher to move more quickly riding when the clues, such as shoe prints, are visible from the saddle. Riders dismount as needed when a closer view or tracking while walking is more advantageous.

== Rescue ==
In a rescue situation today, horses have two main uses: rapid response and subject transport. Both uses occur primarily in areas inaccessible to road-based emergency vehicles: in coastal areas where heavier vehicles tend to become stuck in wet ground or deep sand, and in wilderness areas. In these areas, horses may be used to patrol and in some cases transport people needing assistance. Examples include a volunteer horse patrol at Hampton Beach, New Hampshire.

As an example of a typical MSAR rapid response, a deployment in northern Germany proceeded as follows.

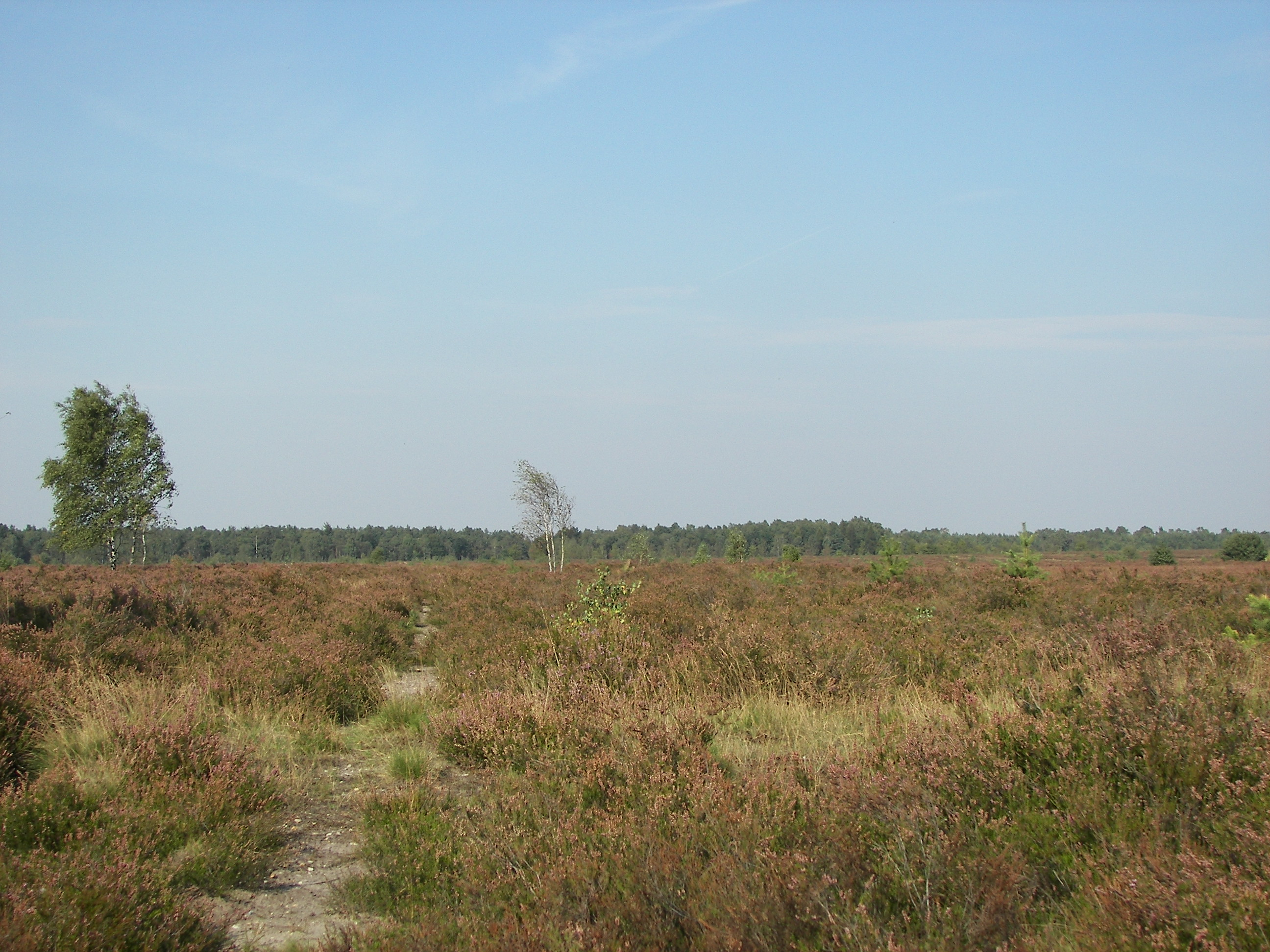
Lüneburg Heath

A deployment on the Lüneburg Heath: At noon on 16 August 2008, a Saturday, on the heath near Undeloh a female tourist experienced anaphylaxis, a life-threatening allergic reaction, due to several insect stings. The emergency dispatcher called the Johanniter horse team and the police in Undeloh, both of which patrol the heath regularly. The horse team galloped 5km to the subject's location. There, a Johanniter rescue assistant and police officers stabilized the unconscious subject well enough that, by the time the ambulance and rescue helicopter arrived, the subject was again conscious and could be transported.

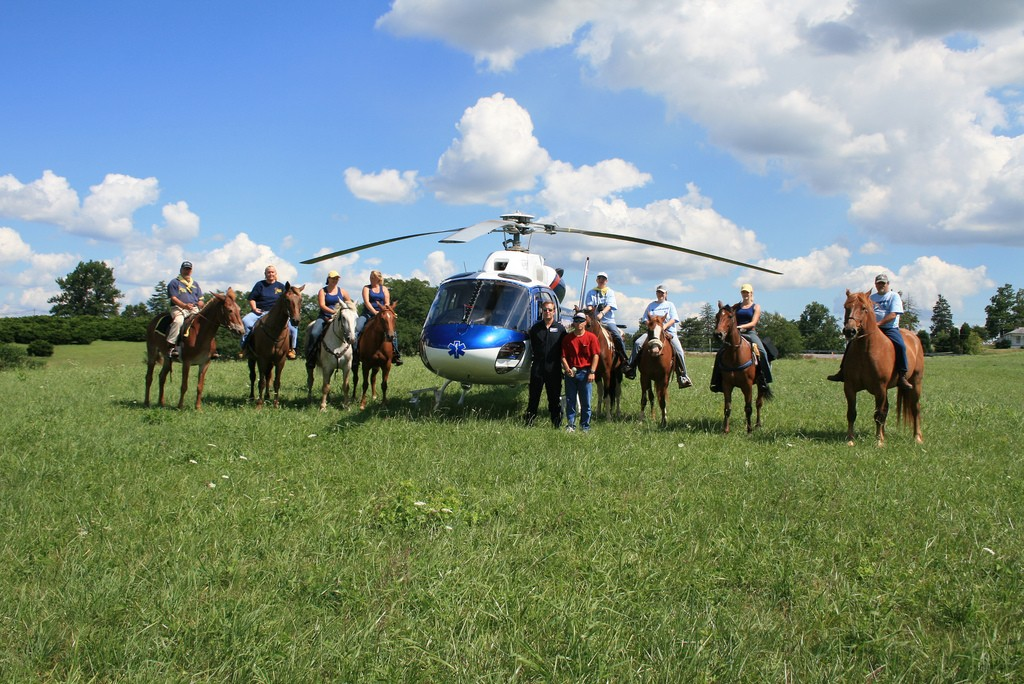
MSAR training with a helicopter air ambulance

In areas where ground-based transport is especially difficult or slow (both urban areas and wilderness), people in need of urgent medical care often are transported by helicopter. In these areas, MSAR teams train in working with helicopters. Training involves identification of suitable landing spots, accustoming horses to helicopters operating in close proximity, and helicopter safety.

Transport in the saddle is used, but has more limited application than a hand carried or animal mounted litter. In the United States transport in the saddle is a method taught and used within the National Park Service in Yosemite National Park and some Mounted SAR personnel have this training.

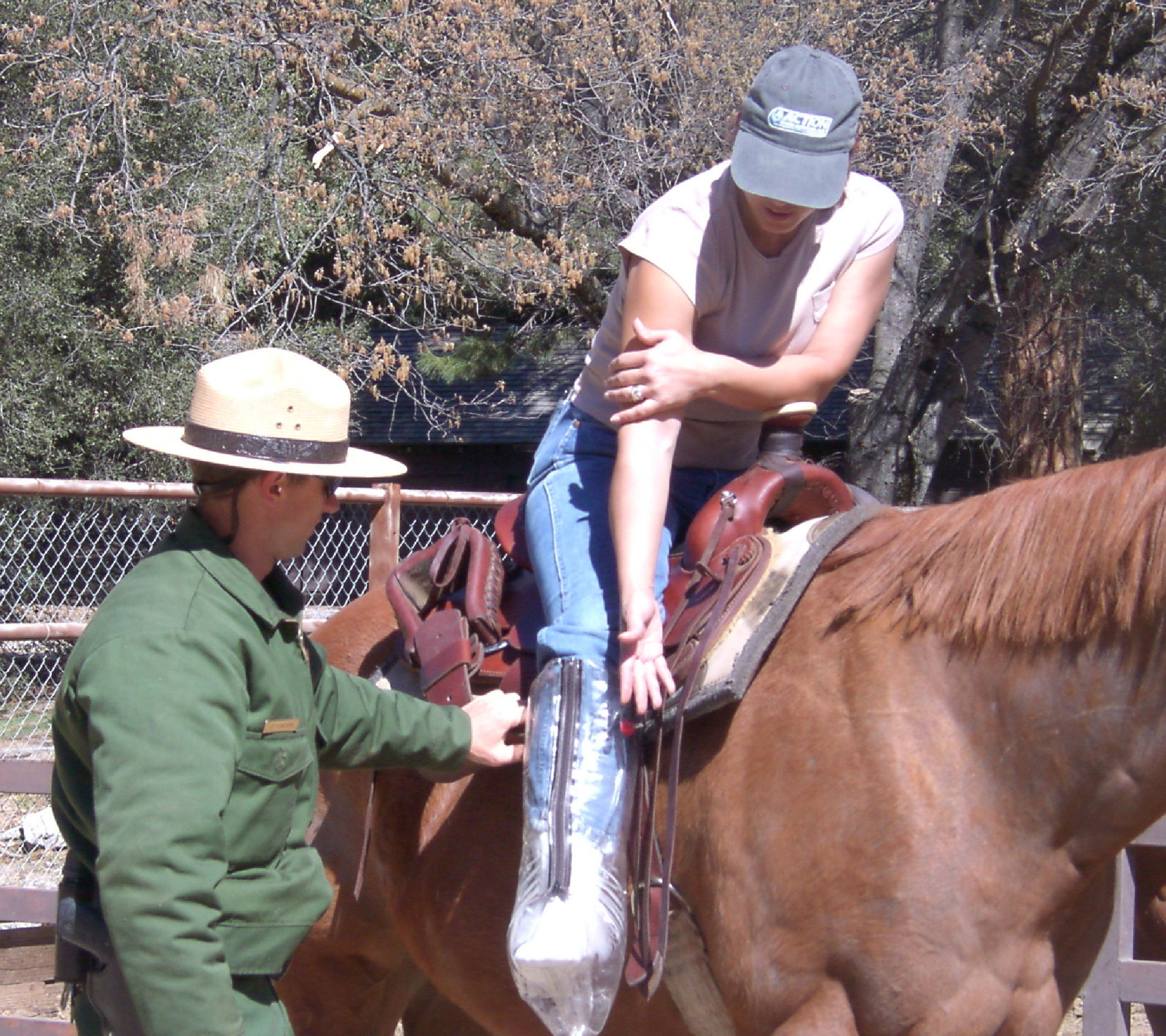
Training for mounted evacuation in the saddle at Yosemite National Park, about 2003.

Mules for medical evacuation is also specialized training for combat soldiers in the Animal Packing Course at the Marine Corps Mountain Warfare Training Center. "Mountain Medicine instructors have developed special saddles for transporting patients who can sit up and stretchers for patients lying down," and these "saddles" are created from materials readily available even in third world countries. Mounted SAR training uses a traditional saddle. A western saddle is shown in the photo.

Equine used as pack animals may also carry medical supplies to support a rescue. Some Mounted SAR units also have pack animals used as resources, but this is more common in more vast wilderness or mountain regions where it is more common to find riders experienced in the use of pack animals. In America, often those members are drawn from professional packers or members of a local unit of Backcountry Horsemen.

=== History ===
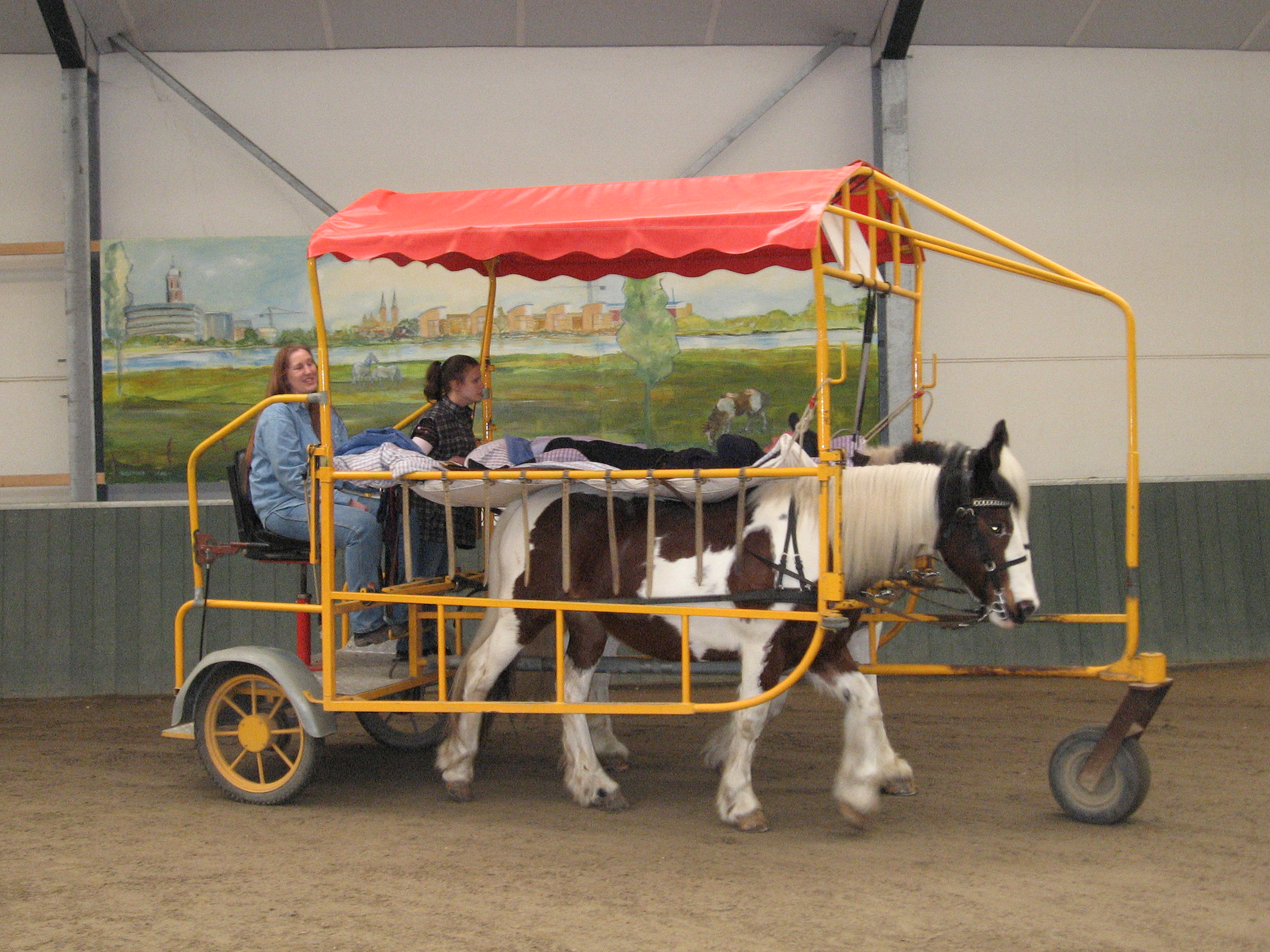
Horse drawn litter, used in the Netherlands

Historically, there were few alternatives to horses for subject transport. Several books and reports have been published, describing transport of sick or injured persons using horses. The equipment described in these publications included a wide variety of special-purpose carts, wagons, and litters. Litters were used to carry passengers between two horses, or on the back of a pack horse or mule (or camel; see Light horse field ambulance).

(*) Note: The “litter” in the picture is not really a litter, designed to protect the patient and to be moved by horses, but a carriage used in hippotherapy; the patient, often multiple disabled, is positioned on a cloth over the back of the horses. The patient will feel all movements and warmth of the horses, which improves (amongst others) blood circulation and health in general.

==== Pack litter ====
In British India a suspended pack litter could be known as a dooly (Hindi: डोली, doli). In Europe, and sometimes in the United States, it was known as a cacolet. The pack litter had two major variants: one carried a single person above the pack animal's back; the other carried two persons, one on each side. In the United States Civil War, horses were fitted with litters to transport wounded soldiers from the battlefield. Similar litters, and training manuals for using them, were produced for the United States Army circa World War I. These litters included the 2-person Carlisle cacolet and the 1-person 1st Division cacolet.

==== Travois ====
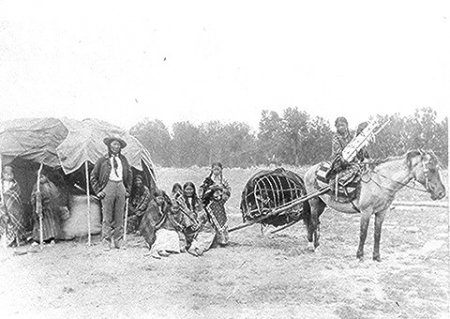
Travois

The travois is very stable and difficult to capsize. Apparently not used in Europe, it was widely used in North America by Native Americans from before the Colonial period. After the 1877 Battle of the Clearwater in Idaho, George Miller Sternberg used travois to move wounded soldiers from the battlefield to a hospital 25 miles away. In very rough field conditions, travois are sometimes used even today.

== See also ==
- Mounted police – Police who patrol on horseback or camelback, usually career (paid) officers
- Horses in warfare – Use of equines in combat
- Night vision – Ability to see in low light conditions
- Texas EquuSearch – Nonprofit search-and-rescue organization
- First responder – Trained emergency personnel
- St John Ambulance – Name of multiple first aid organisations
