= Crows Nest Fire Station =

Fire station in New South Wales, Australia

Coordinates: 33.828192°S 151.199986°E

Crows Nest Fire Station is a fire station located at 99 Shirley Road, Crows Nest, New South Wales and managed by Fire and Rescue New South Wales.

The location is a registered building on the former Register of the National Estate and was designed by government architect W.L. Vernon.

The fire station was opened in February 1907, to meet the increased demand caused by the growing volume of buildings in North Sydney.
