= Vehicle registration plates of New South Wales =

New South Wales, Australian vehicle license plates

The Australian state of New South Wales requires its residents to register their motor vehicles and display vehicle registration plates. Current regular issue plates are to the standard Australian dimensions of 372 mm (14.6 in) in length by 134 mm (5.3 in) in height, and use standard Australian serial dies.

== Issuing authorities ==
Standalone departments/agencies:

- New South Wales Police (up to 1930)
- Department of Road Transport and Tramways (1930–1952)
- Department of Motor Transport (1952–1989)
- Roads & Traffic Authority (1989–2011)

- Then RTA/RMS became a sub agency under a principal department from 2009 for a period of 10 years:

- Transport and Infrastructure NSW (2009–2010)
- Transport New South Wales (2010–2011)

- Roads & Traffic Authority (2009–2011)

- Department of Transport (January 2011 – October 2011)
- Transport for NSW (2011–2015)
- Department of Transport (2015–2019)

- Roads & Maritime Services (1 November 2011 – 1 December 2019)

Since 1 December 2019 the RMS merged into Transport for NSW to form a standalone agency:

- Transport for NSW (1 December 2019 – present)

== Previous general series ==
Cars and Heavy Vehicles

- 1910–1924: nnn•nnn (cars only)
- 1910–1937: L·nn•nnn (lorries only)
- 1924–1937: nnn•nnn (cars only)
- 1937–1951: aa•nnn (cars and lorries)
- 1951–1961: aaa•nnn
- 1961–2004: aaa•nnn

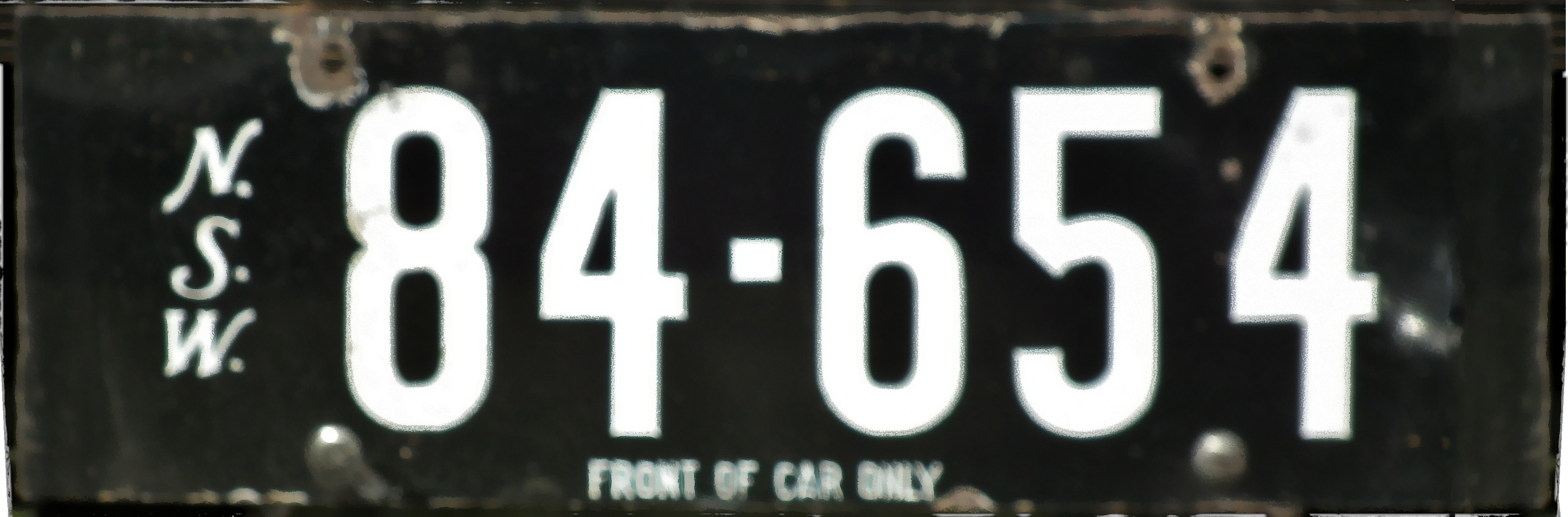
Early NSW car plate, issued 1925

From 1910 to 1937, serials on registration plates for cars were all-numeric, running from 1 to 274-000, while serials on plates for lorries consisted of the letter L followed by up to five numbers. All plates from 1910 to 1924 consisted of black characters on a white background, with the state abbreviation added in 1912. In 1924, the colour scheme for car plates was reversed, so that they consisted of white characters on a black background. Rear plates were supplied by the government and motorists had to request front plates to be made.

From February 1936, a new all numeric standard Australian style embossed plates were introduced to replace various styles that lasted until May 1937. The embossed style continues to the current series. Both sets are issued forward, removing the need for motorists to have front plates made themselves.

On 16 April 1937, a new serial format was adopted for both cars and lorries, consisting of two letters followed by three numbers, with leading zeros as necessary. This ran from AA-000 to ZZ-999, with the letters I and Q omitted to avoid confusion with the numbers 1 and 0 and the letter O. Plates for both vehicle types consisted of white characters on a black background.

When the two-letter serials were exhausted on 3 May 1951, a three-letter format was introduced, starting at AAA-000. At the same time, the plates' colour scheme changed to black characters on a yolk yellow background. The yolk yellow was replaced with a brighter lemon yellow in 1961, by which point the three-letter serial format had reached the mid 'C' series.

In October 1980, from KWO-050 onwards plates with reflective sheeting began to be issued. At the same time, the slogan "NSW – The Premier State" was added at the bottom of the plate; this was used until November 1988. Two further slogans followed, again appearing at the bottom of the plate: "NSW – The First State" from June 1989 to September 1994, and "NSW – Towards 2000" from September 1994 to September 1996. Since September 1996, car plates have carried the full state name at the bottom.

In the three-letter serial format, the letters I and Q were omitted originally, but were allowed from 1970. Several blocks of series were skipped, or were reserved for other vehicle types (see the Skipped Combinations section below). By July 2004, the format had reached the ZLF series, and was thus close to exhaustion. Hence, the current format was introduced, consisting of two letters, two numbers, and two more letters, starting at AA-00-AA.

Plates continue to consist of black characters on a lemon yellow background, with reflective sheeting.

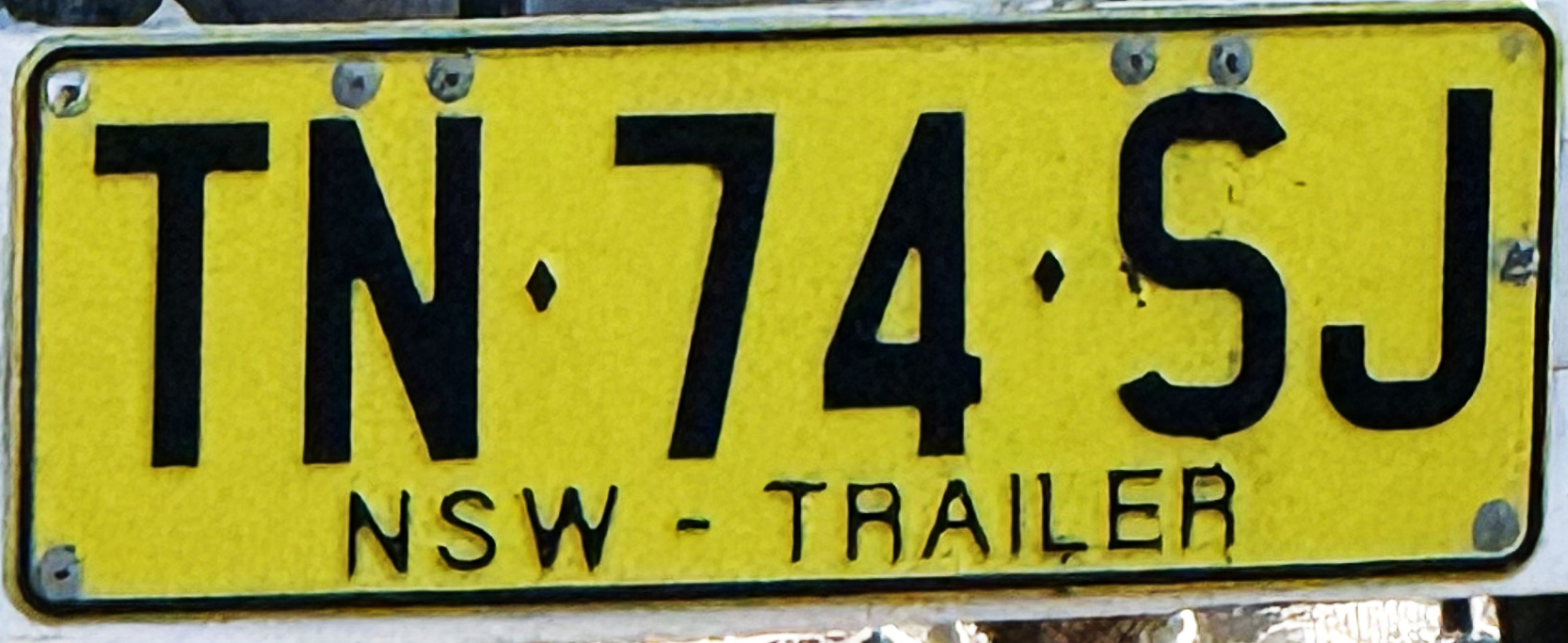
NSW trailer plate

Trailers

- 1910–1924: nnn•nnn
- 1924–1937: nnn•nnn
- 1937–1948: aa•nnn
- 1948–1981: aa•nnnn
- 1981–2014: a•nnnnn

From 1910 to 1948, trailers (and caravans) used the same registration plates and serial formats as cars. In 1948, a separate serial format was introduced for trailers consisting of two letters followed by four numbers. The first letter progressed T, R, A, B and finally C, while the numeric combinations for each series ran from 1000 to 9999; the first serial was thus TA-1000, while the last was CS-9999. Plates continued to consist of white characters on a black background, while the colour scheme for car plates changed (above).

In August 1981, trailer plates adopted the same colour scheme as car plates, of black characters on a lemon yellow background. At the same time, a new serial format was introduced consisting of one letter followed by five numbers, starting at A-00000. This format omitted the letters I, O and T, and was exhausted in December 2014.

In August 2014, a new trailer plate was introduced consisting of black characters on a white background, and a plain "NSW" legend. This plate uses the same two-letter, two-number, two-letter serial format as car plates, but has T as the first letter, with the first serial being TR-00-AA. This serial format began to be used on the current mid yellow trailer plate as well from December 2014, beginning with TA-00-AA; at the same time, the legend on this plate was changed from the full state name to "NSW – TRAILER", the whole TI & TO series was skipped.

Motorcycles

- 1910–1939: nn•nnn
- 1939–1950: aa•nn
- 1950–1961: aa•nnn
- 1961–1989: aa•nnn
- 1989–TBA: aaa•nn

From 1910 to 1939, registration plates for motorcycles consisted of black characters on a white background, and used all-numeric serials of up to five numbers. On 10 July 1939, the colour scheme was reversed to white characters on a black base, and a serial format of two letters followed by two numbers was introduced, running from AA-00 to ZZ-99, with the letters I and Q skipped for the reasons described above. On 14 November 1950, the serial format was expanded to two letters followed by three numbers, starting at AA-000. As with car plates, the colour scheme changed at this point to black characters on a yolk yellow base, with the yolk yellow in turn being replaced with lemon yellow in 1961.

Since October 1980, motorcycles have been provided with one plate rather than two, and plates have been manufactured with reflective sheeting. The two-letter, three-number serial format was exhausted in August 1989, at which point the current format was introduced, consisting of three letters and two numbers, starting at ZZZ-99 and progressing backwards. In November 2009, a plate consisting of black characters on a white background was introduced, using the same serial format but starting at ABA-00 and progressing forwards. As of June 2023, H prefix are now issued and is nearing completion. I Prefix series started to be issued as of November 2024. Anticipate there will be a new series after the AAA-NN series will be exhausted for yellow series as the available new combinations for black on white was exhausted and unissued blocks have been allocated. Since October 2023, all motorcycle plates have switched the diamond separator to vertical.

== Current general series ==
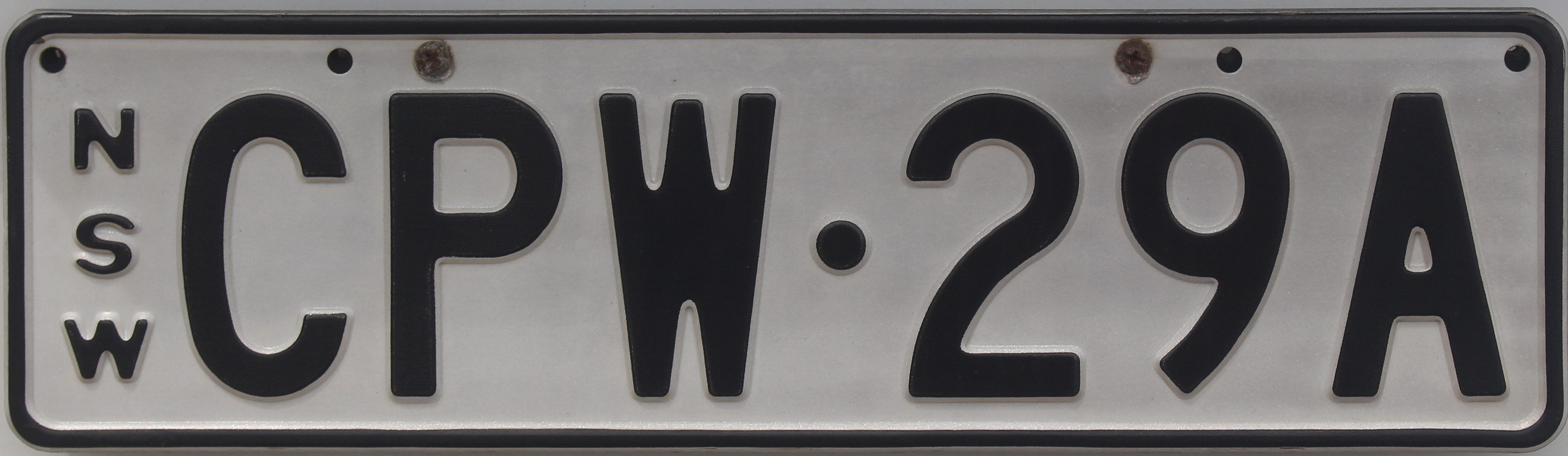
NSW slimline light vehicle plate

- Cars and Heavy Vehicles: AA·nn·aa – commenced July 2004.
- Slimline light vehicle series: aaa·nna – commenced 1991.
- Trailers: TA·nn·aa – commenced December 2014 from TA-03-AA.
- Trailers: TR·nn·aa – commenced August 2014 from TR-00-AA.
- Motorcycles: ZYX·nn – commenced August 1989 from ZZZ-99; progresses backwards (currently issuing 'I' series). Expected to be replaced by a new combination series in the future.
- Motorcycles: ABC·nn – commenced November 2009 from ABA-00; progresses forwards (currently issuing 'AA' series). Expected to be replaced by a new combination series in the future.

== Information on current general series ==
- Yellow general series: From 20 July 2004, combinations changed to AA-00-AB from the previous general series ending as ZLF-999 and is embossed under NEW SOUTH WALES. As of 5 September 2025, embossed full integrated EV and H identifier pressed into base surface has become available for black on yellow government issued plates for EV & Hydrogen vehicles.
- Slimline: In March 1991, the slimline set plates produced as a de-embossed border was introduced from AAA-11A in black on reflective white. By 24 October 2005 starting from AWA-00A the bordered slimline replaced the first version. As of week ending 5 September 2025, a new next generation slimline plate with an embossed full integrated identifier pressed into base surface has been launched, for EV & H for Hydrogen vehicles. See Transport for NSW (TFNSW) media release and Drive.com.au
- Trailer yellow series: - From December 2014 replacing the previous 1981-2014 general series starting at TA-11-AA
- Trailer white series: - From August 2014 replacing the previous 2009-2014 general series allocation starting at TR-01-AA
- Motorcycle yellow series: - From August 1989 replacing the previous 1950–1989 series, starting at ZZZ-00 and into final blocks starting from IZZ-00.
- Motorcycle white series: - From August 2009 including from the pool of general series allocation starting at PKZ-00 and then moved forth from ABA-00 since 2012.As of 2025 it has reached HZZ-99 and currently issuing un-issued blocks.

== Allocated series ==
General issue combinations at the start of each year (cars and trucks)
1910	1911	1912	1913	1914	1915	1916	1917	1918	1919
Nil	1	1000	3000	5000	6000	7-999	8-999	10-999	15-999
1920	1921	1922	1923	1924	1925	1926	1927	1928	1929
21-999	30-999	40-999	53-999	67-999	77-999	88-999	99-999	100-999	178-999
1930	1931	1932	1933	1934	1935	1936	1937	1938	1939
200-999	213-999	223-999	236-999	249-999	259-999	269-999	AA-000	DN-999	FA-999
1940	1941	1942	1943	1944	1945	1946	1947	1948	1949
JA-999	LB-999	LZ-999	MA-999	MD-999	NA-999	TX-999	ZZ-999	AA-999	UW-999
1950	1951	1952	1953	1954	1955	1956	1957	1958	1959
ZZ-999	AAA-000	AEK-000	ALY-000	APB-000	AUG-000	BCC-000	BKC-000	BSA-000	BWA-000
1960	1961	1962	1963	1964	1965	1966	1967	1968	1969
CAA-000	CLL-000	CTA-000	DAA-000	DKA-000	DOJ-000	EDA-000	EMA-000	AAA-000	BAJ-000
1970	1971	1972	1973	1974	1975	1976	1977	1978	1979
AIA-000	CWI-000	DXI-000	GEA-000	GQA-000	HEA-000	HQA-000	JCA-050	JPE-050	KBH-050
1980	1981	1982	1983	1984	1985	1986	1987	1988	1989
FOA-000	LCZ-050	LOS-050	MBE-050	MOZ-050	NEA-050	NTZ-050	OFE-050	OSA-050	PHA-050
1990	1991	1992	1993	1994	1995	1996	1997	1998	1999
RGZ-050	RQB-050	SAA-000	SPF-050	TCM-050	TOA-050	UCW-050	QUA-050	UWA-050	VOD-050
RGZ-050	AAA-11A	ABS-12A	ACR-12A	ADR-12A	AEF-12A	AEX-12A	AFJ-76A	AGI-12A	AGW-12A
2000	2001	2002	2003	2004	2005	2006	2007	2008	2009
WKA-050	XCA-050	XQD-050	YFA-050	ZBM-050	AC-00-MA	AI-00-ZZ	AN-00-NZ	AT-00-WB	AZ-00-CE
AHA-12A	AIP-12A	AJP-12A	ALT-12A	AOA-12A	ATB-12A	AXA-12A	BBA-12A	BHA-12A	BOA-21A
2010	2011	2012	2013	2014	2015	2016	2017	2018	2019
BC-00-CE	BH-00-AA	BM-00-HG	BT-00-TA	BY-00-VB	CC-00-CC	CG-00-NA	CK-00-VA	CO-00-VO	CS-00-SL
BVC-00A	CAD-00A	CGS-00A	CME-00A	CSA-00A	CYE-00A	DCZ-00A	DLH-00A	DTI-00A	EAA-00A
2020	2021	2022	2023	2024	2025	2026	2027	2028	2029
CW-00-JC	DA-00-AA	DD-00-UA	DG-00-CE	DI-00-LL	DM-00-UL	DQ-12-JS			
EGN-00Z	ELZ-99Z	ERI-00A	EXE-19Q	FEQ-00A	FNJ-00A	FYC-00W			

Other allocations

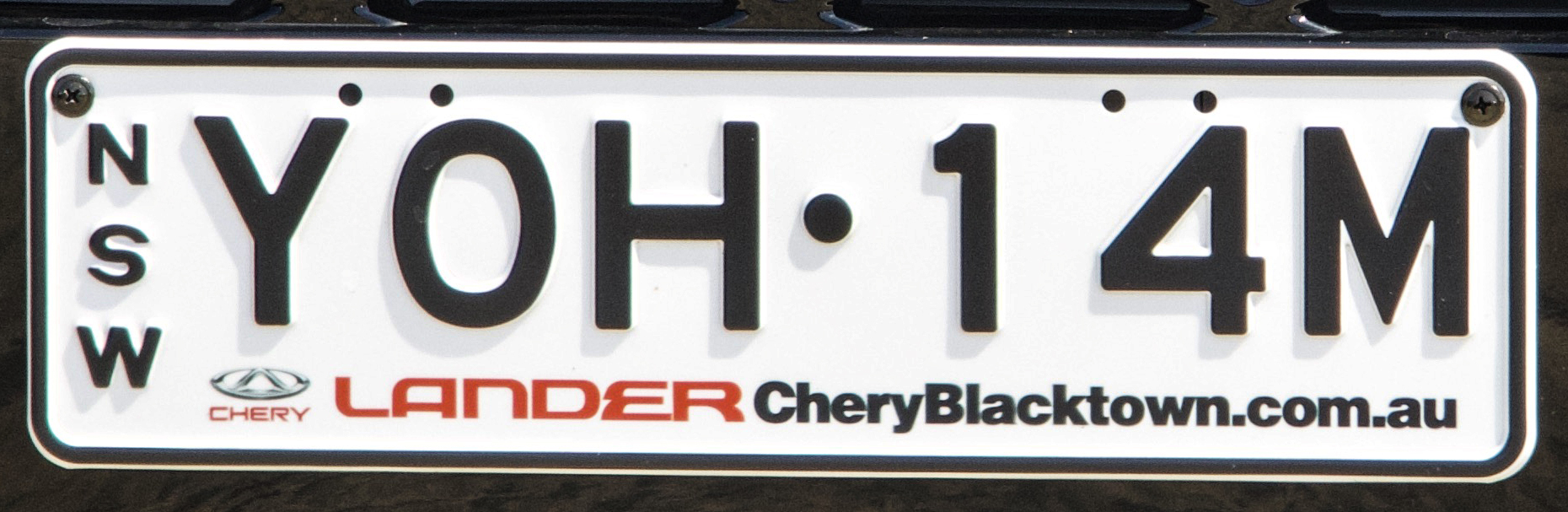
Dealer slimline plate

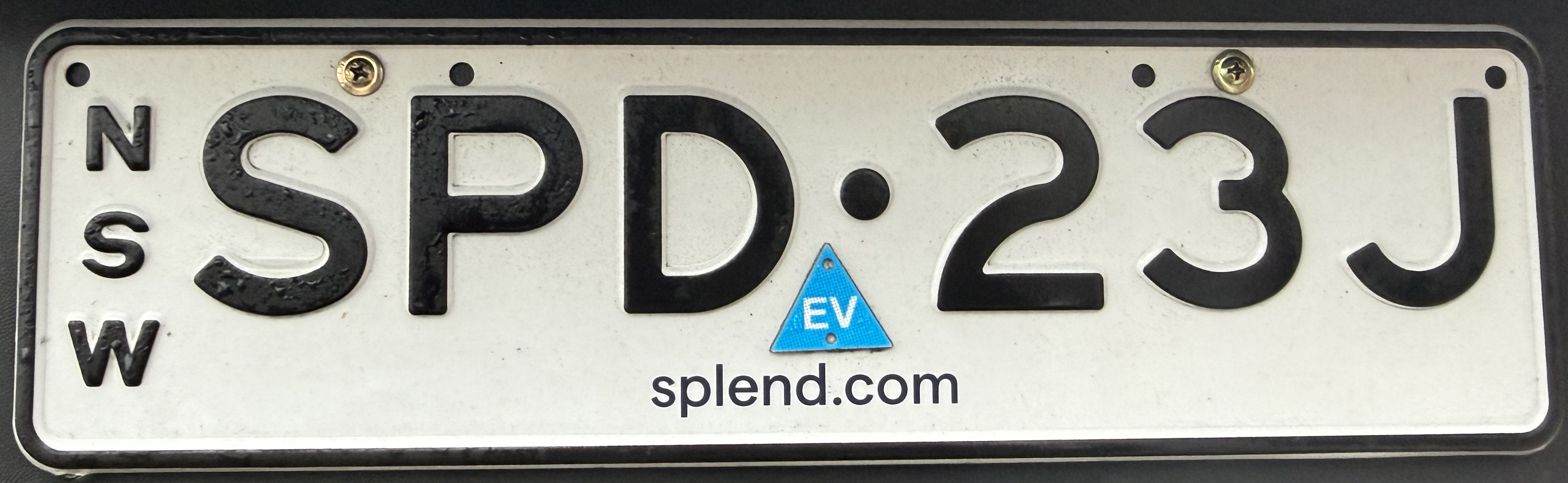
Splend lease slimline plate

- Dealer Slimline: Same serial format as general slimline plates but with Y as the first letter, the first serial being YBA-00A. The name or web address of the dealer in question is screened at the bottom, along with any corresponding logos. Some dealers plates have since been discontinued mostly Holden Dealers or through change of dealership. At the start of 2026, a full sized style with slimline combinations in the middle and later with the international style has been introduced.
- Business Plates: Business Plates become available during 2021 and so far two businesses plates have been issued. It has since expanded to include more businesses.
- Fleet Plates: Fleet managers had plates allocated and issued for SG Fleet and Summit in full standard size and Fleet manager's business name printed below. SG Fleet plates has since changed to Dealer slimline size as reported in September 2015. Summit soon changed the size too. SG fleet plates are issued in BQA, CAA & CCB blocks and now into SGF. Summit Fleet was in CFF series but now moved over to SUM series.
- Motorcycle Dealers: From BNA to BNZ, BPA to BRZ, BTA to BTZ, BVA to BXZ, CXA-CXZ and in various allocations DTA onwards. As of May 2021 Motorcycle Dealers now start from GAA-00 onwards. Various dealer names are screenprinted at the top between embossed NSW with some printed bottom texts. As of 2026, it is filling in un-issued blocks between AAA-00 to HZZ-99.

General notes When a black on yellow plate is judged to be in need of replacement, Transport for NSW are required to manufacture a replacement at no cost to the owner, hence it is quite common to see plates from older series in the current format. Registration plates, both personalised and standard, are able to be transferred between vehicles. A number of Sydney bus operators still recycle old plates including Forest Coach Lines and Punchbowl Bus Company. As of April 2023, Forest Coach Lines has been rebranded as CDC NSW and Punchbowl Bus Company will be exiting after bus contracts are awarded to another company.

== Skipped combinations ==
Historic

- aaa·nnn – combinations from the 'A' series through the 'E' series containing I and Q were originally skipped, before being issued from 1970 to 1972 prior to the commencement of the 'G' series, the 'F' series was reserved for trucks until 1980; series FOA–FPZ were subsequently issued on cars, the entire 'I' series was skipped, except for red on white interstate truck series ISA–ISZ that started in the early 1950s, series FAA–FNZ (except FBY), FUA–FUZ, WBB–WCZ and ZLG–ZZY were also skipped.

Current (aa·nn·aa)

- Suffix letters – IA–IZ and OA–OZ (except AA–IA to AA–IZ, issued in 2004), BU–GA to BU–GZ, CU–NA to CU–NZ.
- Prefix letters – AS, AX and BO.
- Trailer series – All combinations starting with TI & TO are skipped.
- Out of sequence issues – BV issued after BW, DI issued after DJ.

Premium (aaa·nna)

- AFP, AFR, ASS, AVA-AVZ, BQB-BQZ, BRA, BRC-BRH, BRJ-BRZ, BUA-BUZ, BXJ-BXZ, BYA-BYZ, CAU-CAZ, CCC-CCZ, CFN-CFZ, CKB-CKZ, CLG-CLX, CLZ, CUA-CUZ, DEA-DEZ, DGV-DGZ, DIA-DIZ, DOA-DOZ, DRA-DRZ, DUA-DUZ, EFA-EFZ, FAA-FAZ, FIA-FIZ, FKA-FKZ, FQA-FQZ, FUA-FUZ, GAA-GAZ. CBA-CBZ series are allocated to white-on-blue series. Some previously skipped combinations are now issued over the counter, e.g. BRB in blue-on-white and CKA in Eurostyle. EVA-EVZ initially skipped but now issued to fill in after EWZ completed.

== Gallery of general-series plates ==
Years	Plate style	Years	Plate style
1937–1951	White-on-black plate with aa·nnn serial format, issued 1939	1951–1980	Black-on-lemon yellow plate with state abbreviation at top, issued 1979
1980–1988	Plate featuring "The Premier State" slogan, issued 1987	1988–1994	Plate featuring "The First State" slogan, issued 1989
1994–1996	Plate featuring the “Towards 2,000” slogan, issued 1996	1996–2004	Plate with full state name at bottom, issued 1998
2004–present	Plate with aa·nn·aa serial format, issued 2016		

== MyPlates range ==
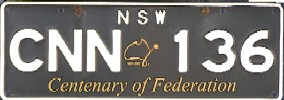
NSW – Centenary of Federation, special edition, 2001

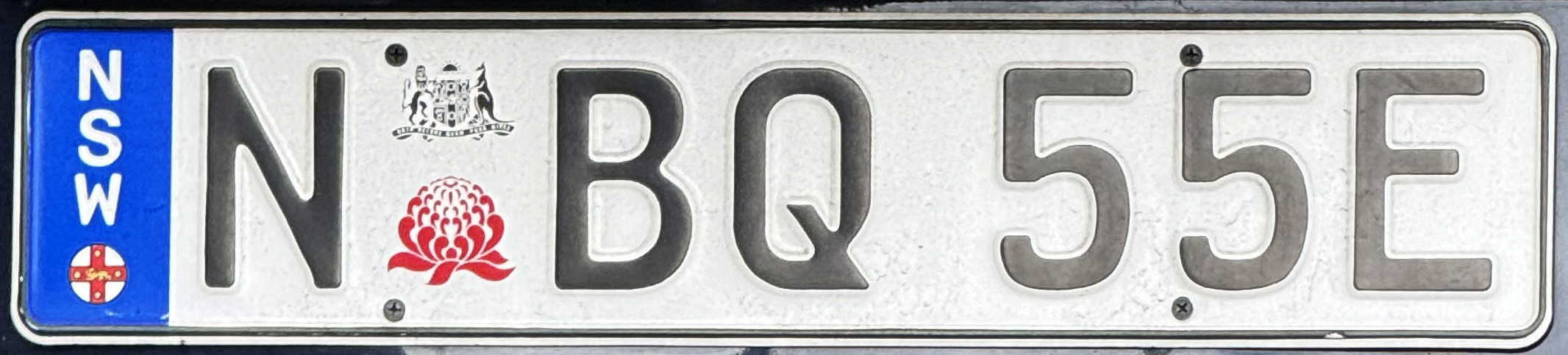
Euro Plate NSW, 2002–2025 as replaced by an updated version

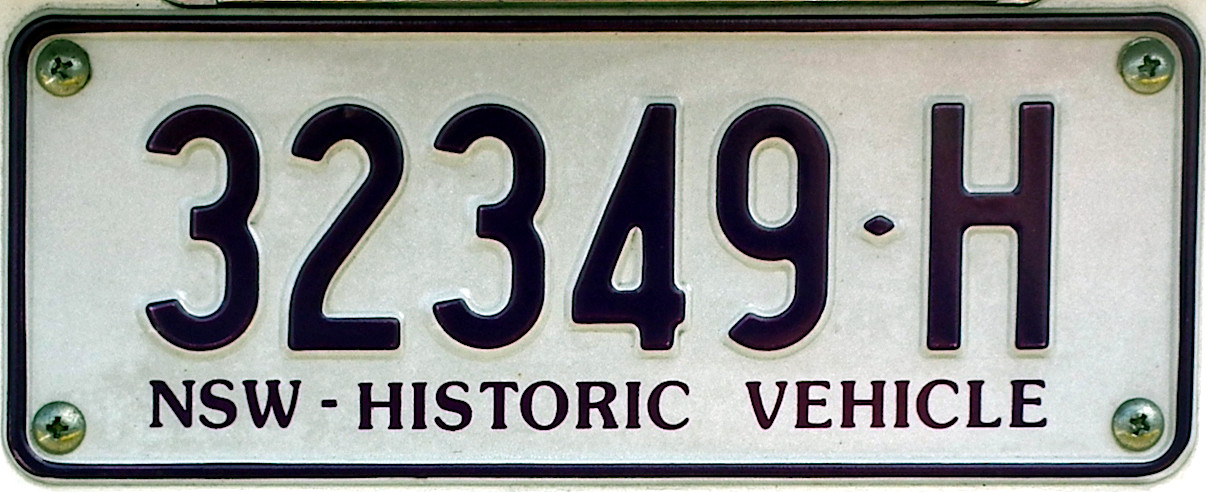
Historic vehicle plate

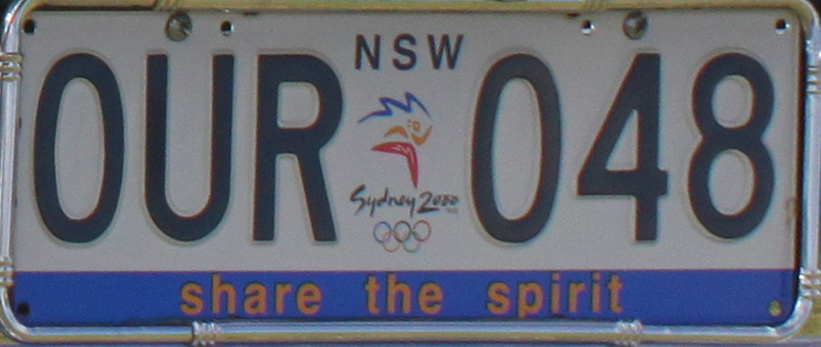
NSW plate Share the Spirit

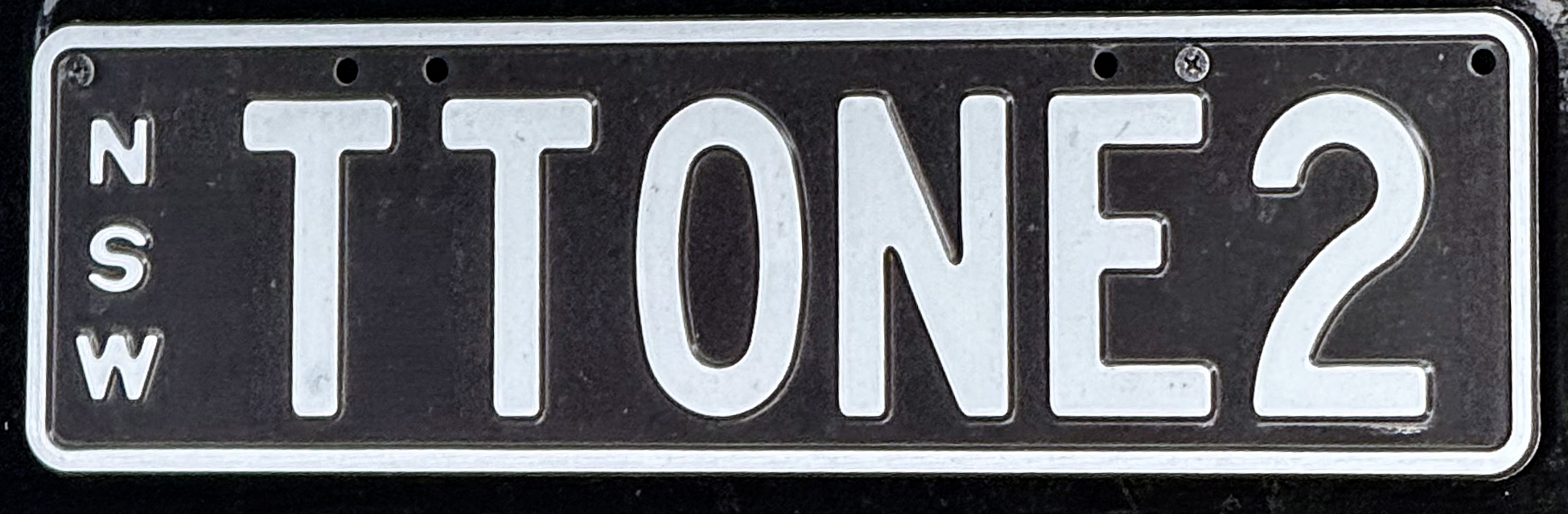
Personalised

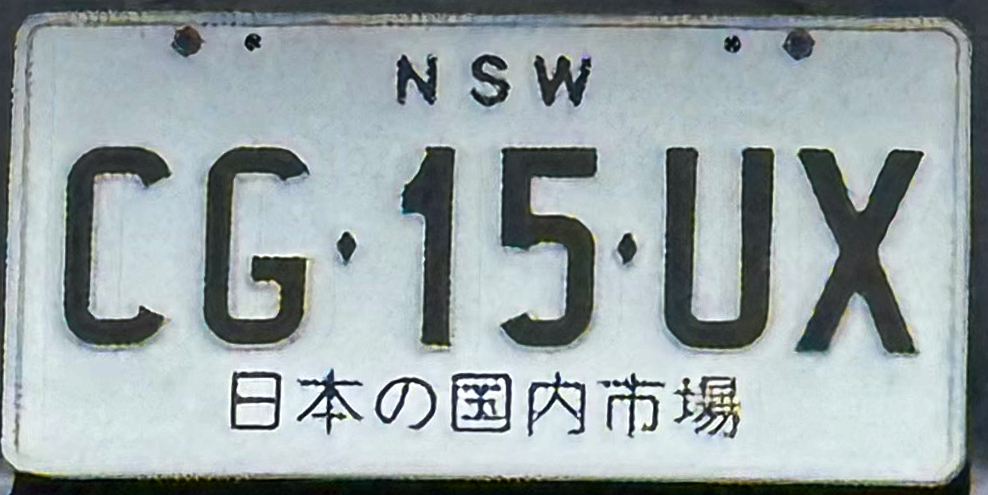
Japanese style

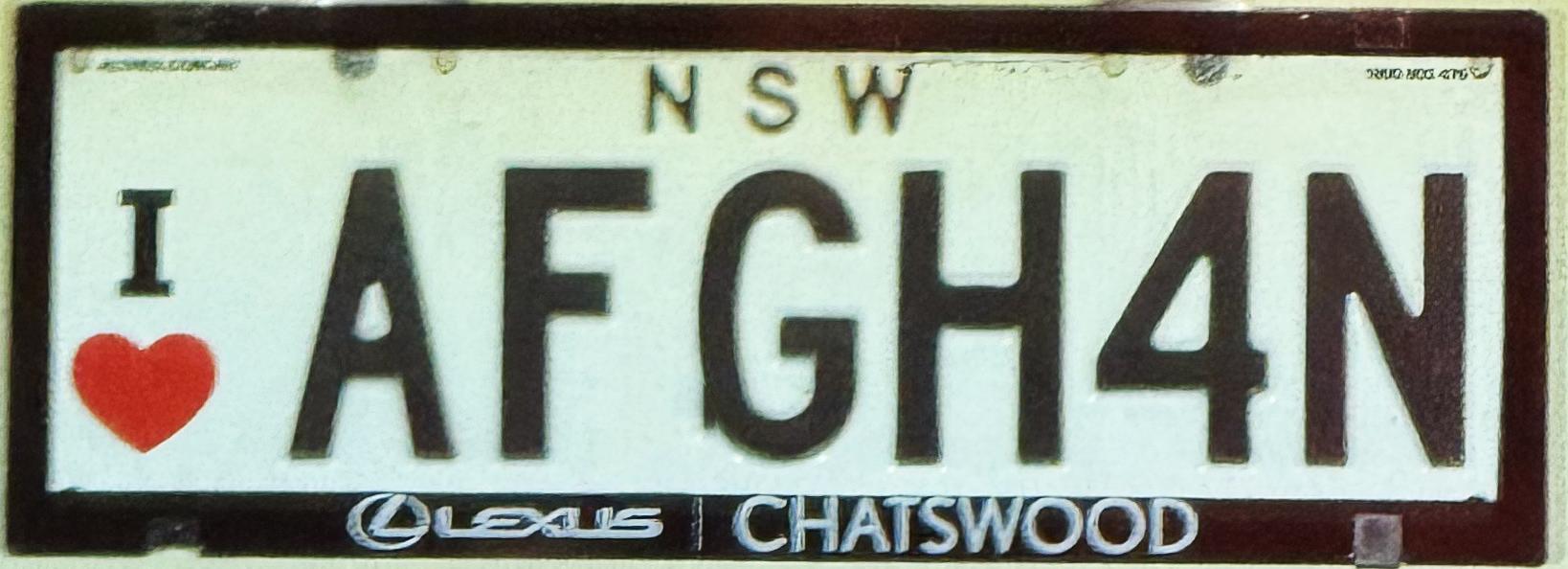
I love style

"MyPlates" range is a product of the Plate Marketing Pty Ltd on behalf of Transport for NSW since 1 October 2010. Prior to that, Roads and Traffic Authority of NSW managed the business. It offers personalisation of registration plates including plate colour and content. Since 2009, all non-reflective bases have been converted to reflective.

Formats available by type of vehicle:

- Light vehicles options up to 14 GVM: aa-nnn, aa-nnnn, aaa-nnn, aaa-nna, aa-nn-aa, nnn-aaa, nn-aaa, nn-aaaa, custom (where c can be a numeral, letter or space as it's a customised style)
- Motorcycle format options: aa-nnn, aaa-nn, nn-aaa, custom
- Trailer Light options: a-nnnnn, aa-nnnn, aa-nn-aa, custom
- Trailer Heavy options: aaa-nnn, nnn-aaa, nn-aaaa, aa-nnn, aa-nnnn, custom
- Heavy vehicles options: aaa-nnn, nnn-aaa, nn-aaaa, aa-nnn, aa-nnnn, custom

History of plate launches

- Prior to 1969

- Any motorists requests personalised plates applied for it and then allocated to be placed on a waiting list for the unissued blocks to be issued.
- White on black personalised introduced on an adhoc basis – Cars AB-123 & Motorcycle AB-12
- White on black personalised into AB-1234 and black on yellow ABC-123 were also on an adhoc basis.
- After 1969, any motorists requests personalised plates for an once off fee and is manufactured straight away to be issued to the applicant.
- From October 1980, Black on lemon base plates changed to reflective and NSW-THE PREMIER STATE slogan introduced.

- 1981

- Custom Plates introduced initially as NSW-THE PREMIER STATE in black on reflective lemon base.

- 1987

- Custom Plates replaced by current Custom yellow.
- Bicentenary plates launched – black on reflective white with shield – ABC-123 (AAA-050 TO ABZ-999) and later added AB-123

- 1991

- Premium slimline plates were introduced commencing at AAA-11A, black on reflective white base in smaller embossed characters and NSW embossed at left hand side.

- 1994

- Premium slimline personalised plates were introduced and was offered in combinations – AB-123, AB-1234, ABC-123 & CUSTOM

- 1997

- RSL Plates in green on mid yellow – "NSW Lest We Forget"

- 1998

- Sydney Olympic Games Plates – "Share the Spirit" in black on white with blue band on bottom and the Sydney Olympic Logo – ABC-123, AB-123 & AB-1234

- 2000

- Due to popular demand, Olympic slimlines introduced – ABC-123, AB-123 & AB-1234

- 2001

- Centenary of Federation plates available for 12 months ABC-123, AB-123 & AB-1234 and CF series 1901-CF to 2001-CF were offered in reflective embossed white characters. Recent remakes are now in reflective black base.

- 2002

- White Euro plates: N aa-nnn and N aa-nna new style of plates fitting European dimensions was introduced in April 2002. In these plates, the N is compulsory prefix then spaced combinations.
- New England plates that ran for about 4 years.

- 2003

- The colour range were introduced. See colour chart.

- 2004

- White on black personalised extended into ABC-123

- 2005

- Metallic range was introduced. See colour chart.
- Premium slimline plates replaced by bordered slimline plates commencing at AWA-11A

- 2006

- Black Euro introduced, and an auction custom i.e. N-CSTM1 was conducted.

- 2007

- Sydney Harbour Bridge plates – SHB Harbour Bridge shaped plates from SHB-1 to SHB-99 only sold via on-line auctions. In white on graphic background of the bridge. Standard slimline series HB-12-AC issued for 12 months those sales ceased on 27 March 2008. Black on white with bridge graphic in light grey.

- 2008

- NRL Team Plates – Plates for NRL fans team colours are introduced.
- Centenary NRL Footy plates of all NRL teams were sold through an online auction – They comes in team colours and the number digits represents half back half eight, front rowers, back rowers, centres and wingers. The auction has since been completed.

- 2009

- HSV, FPV and V8 Supercar plates were introduced. From 22 September 2010, slimline version were added.
- All plates range changed to reflective bases.

- 2010

- Corporate plates with business names and logos are introduced

- 2012

- Bright lights commences on 1 May 2012 and was initially in black base only with reflective colours are Venetian green, casino sunrise, moulin rougue, gold rush, midnight jazz, hot flamingo and blue lagoon. It was extended to motorcycles during November 2012. The range has since been modified to include reflective black with the rest of reflective colour choices.
- The first number personalised plate range begins, allowing motorists to choose alternative series as the current personalised plates capacity are near full or not available. Current range of plate options will apply to all first number combinations as shown as 123-ABC, 12-ABC & 12-ABCD.

- 2013

- Custom Traditional black introduced. Custom yellow expanded into AA-123, AA-1234, ABC-123, 123-ABC, 12-ABC & 12-ABCD combinations.
- Art range – 7 selected designs were launched.
- Tech Range released 4 November 2013

- 2014

- US sized plates released – comes in US style star spangles, NSW State plate and black on white plain.
- Le Chic & Vintage range introduced on 13 July 2014
- Bright Lights now withdrawn from sale as they are under review following customer feedback that the colours are hard to read by a normal human eye. As of Feb 2015, 9604 sets will be recalled and replaced by a larger & clearer version of bright lights. Prototype sets are being pressed and tested prior to potential re-release.
- Art Cycle range launched 30 September
- 2014 Premiership plates launched 6 October

- 2015

- formerly called Bright Lights now relaunched as Colour on Black available for car and light vehicles at this stage.
- Black on coloured plates base introduced.
- Australiana Range launched 16 November 2015.
- AB-123 & 12-ABC blocks have been removed from NRL range following complaints of character spacing.

- 2016

- Ford Mustang plates commenced 1 March offered in white on black or black on white with Mustang logo and red, white, and blue stripes draped downside on top after "NSW".
- Japanese plates designs become known in March. Green on white base in Japanese symbols at left and NSW right next to the symbol on top. Launch date is now confirmed for 27 June 2016. Designs have been amended in readiness for release—Original JDM now called JDM Classic while the other JDM is a new design, NSW at top while the bottom is in Japanese inscription and is designed to accommodate 2X2X2 combinations.
- Marine Rescue NSW Charity Trailer only plates launched 28 March 2016
- State of Origin NSW Theme plate launched 3 May 2016. Updated twice since 2020 and into current version in 2021.
- All Euro ranges are now offered in both slimline or large sizes for front of vehicles, effective 1 July 2016.
- 2 Oct 2016 2016 Premiers Cronulla Sharks released
- 1 Nov 2016 – Australian Range expanded – Whale, Sunset, Surf, Skyline and Black Bridge Tech Plate – Brushed Metal added on range.

- 2017

- 28 May 2017 Classic Stripes range released in 7 stripes colour choices. Now reduced with removal of gold, navy and green colours.
- 4 September 2017 – Wanderlust range in 6 choices and two Socceroos plates launched. Carbon Fibre now include red, blue and green.
- 28 September 2017 – Updated Supercars design launched.
- 1 October 2017 – 2017 NRL Premiership launched for the winning team – Melbourne Storm.
- 19 November 2017 – Dog and Cats (Animal range as current), Newcastle United Jets, Sydney FC, Western Sydney Wanderers and Mariners and Zodiac range released and all except animal range are withdrawn as of July 2021.

- 2018

- 12 February 2018 – (Animal Range) added are Kangaroo, Paws and Koalas, then extended to trailers in all ranges. Australian and Wanderlust range extended to trailers. As of July 2021, Koala and Kangaroos were withdrawn.
- June – Prestige plates introduced in 2009 has been removed from sale as now no longer offered.
- October – Serenity New age style plates and Statement Plates released – # SAMPLE, @ SAMPLE and I (love) SAMPLE. Serenity now withdrawn as of July 2021

- 2019

- 7 February – Euro Platinum Plates, Euro sized coloured and Black on white & Black on yellow Japanese JDM plates released. Leather & Tough cycle plates also released.
- Horses plates added, and updated Eels/Storms NRL plates, now include hyphen in the middle to streamline with the remainder of sports plates. Rest of NRL plates not yet updated.
- Personalised plates in NSW reached 50 years since the launch.
- V8 Supercar plates have been removed from sale effective 22 July 2019.
- 2 September – Pastel, Chinese Traditional and Music launched. BlackCarbon fibre added for Euro Premium and slimline premium range. Panthers NRL plates has a 3rd revised version including hyphen.
- 8 October 2019 – 2019 NRL Premier Roosters added and A League Soccer plates updated. Socceroos and Matildas plates discontinued

- 2020

- 21 April 2020 – NRL plates range revamped, first time in 12 years on my plates website but rolled back to the old version after only 24 hours and relaunched on 28 May, Botanical Range 4 choices and introduction of NSW HEAVY TRAILER legend plates comes in White on Black and Black on gold custom colour. AA-000, AA-0000, AAA-000, 000-AAA will be used.
- 28 May 2020 – NRL Plates relaunched, 4 Comic range choices launched.
- 20 July 2020 – Cute, Camo and Sport & Leisure range launched

- 2021

- February 2021 – Glitter, Flag range launched.
- March 2021 – Three new colour on black Euro, in yellow, green and orange and White on black international introduced.
- July 2021 – New motorcycle plates were added – Rockabilly, Wings and Rock N Roll
- August 2021 – Cricket bat and Soccer ball were added as a new to Sports and Leisure range.As of May 2026 it is noted all Sport and Leisure Range has been discontinued.
- Dec 2021 – Gold Coast Titans and Wests Tigers has logo updated and slight change of colour hues.

- 2022

- August 2022 – A total of 85 plates offerings have been withdrawn from sale
- September 2022 – Updated Cupid, and Vintage, introduced Retro decades range and Opposites range – a total of 11 new light vehicle and 2 motorcycle styles.
- December 2022 – 4 new Indigenous art range launched

- 2023

- February 2023 – Black statement I heart and NRL's Dolphins range launched.
- July 2023 – International range has new colours added and new Dog plate added
- November 2023 – Ocean Waves added. As of that date Cute and Comics range withdrawn and wanderlust only available for trailers.

- 2024

- November 2024 – AFL range launched, colour choices reduced as white on Vivid Blue, Burnt Orange, DeepPurple and Hot Pink as well black on red & blue are removed from sale. Burnt Orange remain for motorcycles while wheat colours for cycles & trailer are removed.

- 2025

- February 2025 – Ford 100th Anniversary plates launched in two options.
- July 2025 - Retro decades range has been withdrawn from sale.
- August 2025 - Harry Potter and DC Comics range launched.
- 1 October 2025 - HSV, FPV and V8 Supercar plates originally introduced in 2009 has been discontinued and replaced by an updated style under Holden and Ford plates Range that also added Holden and Tough Ford styles in slimline while Ford Tough is in international size.Euro sports introduced.
- 10 November 2025 - Euro range has been updated with new NSW Coat of arms across the range.

- 2026

- January 2026 – Some coloured plates have been updated across light vehicles and trailer to reflect with the manufacturing changes.
- February 2026 – Lunar New Year & Euro Sports Ranges launched.
- May 2026 - EV Euro Glow range, 2 options launched
- September 2026 AFL and NRL Premiership plates including women's unveiled after the Grand Finals.
- October 2026 - EV debossed plate options added in slimline range on a limited option Gold, white and Silver on reflective black base and traditional white on reflective black base. From 1 December 2026 the EV option will be added to the rest of range when requesting an EV version.

== MyPlates Coloured plates range ==
Offered in colours are:
Colour on black: AAA·nnn AAA·nnn AAA·nnn AAA·nnn AAA·nnn AAA-nnn
Coloured on white: AAA·nnn AAA·nnA AA·nnn AA·nnnn nn·AAA nn·AAAA nnn·AAA CUSTOM
Coloured range: AAA·nnn AA·nnn AA·nnnn AAA·nnn AAA·nnn AAA·nnn
Premium Range: AAA·nnn AA·nnnn AAA·nnn AAA·nnn AAA·nnn AAA·nnn

Exclusions & choices: Motorists can choose any combined letters and numbers including solely letters (maximum 6 characters). Plate customisation has also been added into the coloured, premium range and recently motorcycles (7 March). Certain restrictions about combinations have been put in place to prevent people from designing plates which appear too much like numeral-only plates which are auctioned off separately (e.g. 9I2 would not be allowed as it is too similar to 912). There are also restrictions preventing people from picking combinations that are too similar to special plates issued by Transport for NSW (for instance, HC-nnn and HC-nnnn combinations are reserved only for accredited hire-car operators which is not currently newly issued).

== Special purpose vehicles ==
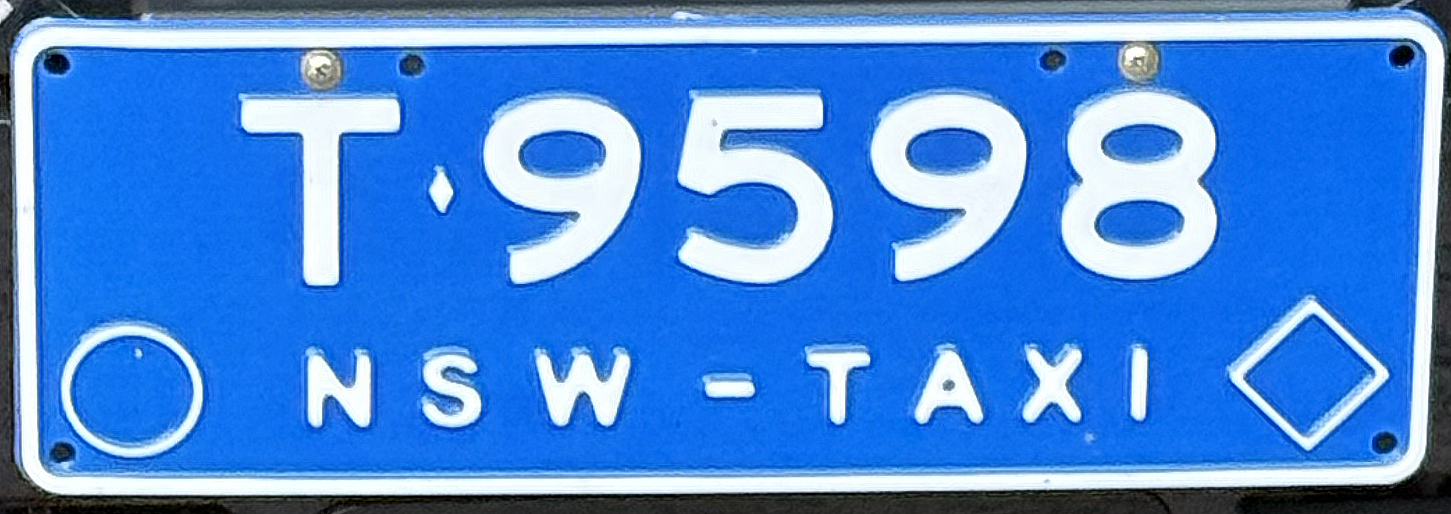
Taxicab

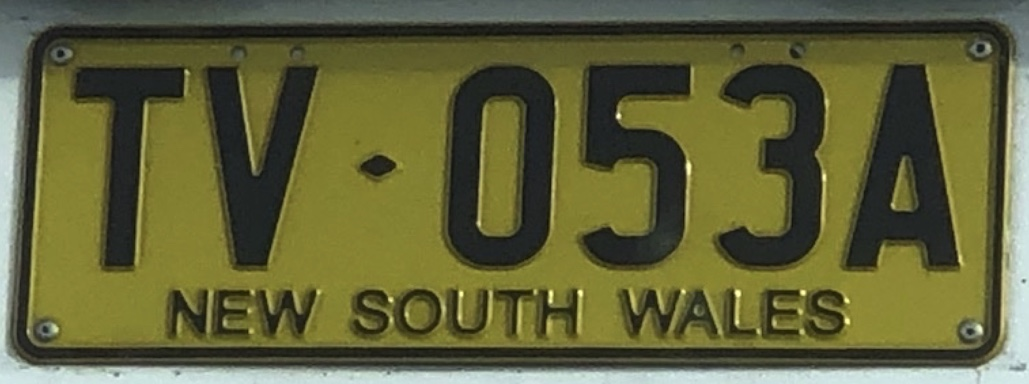
Tourist Vehicle

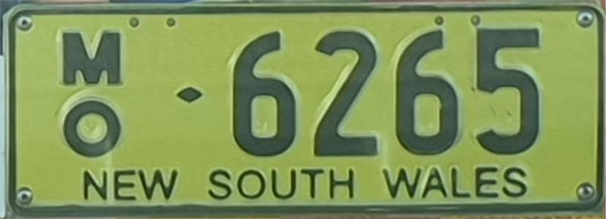
Metro (Buses)

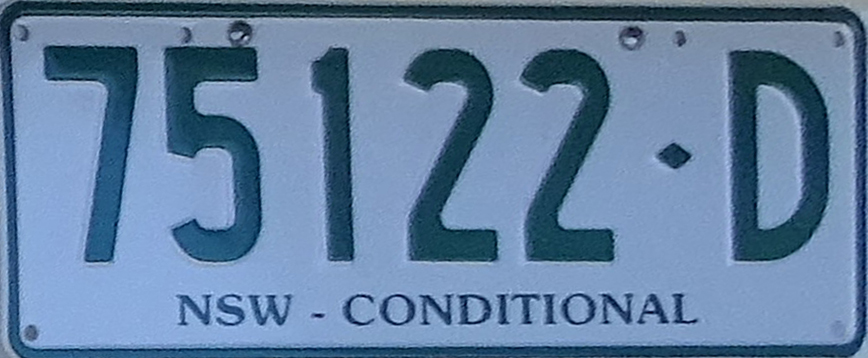
Conditional

Vehicles with particular purposes in New South Wales have been introduced with numberplates specific to their type.

- Taxis have two types of plate: Sydney, Newcastle and Wollongong plates have a T·nnnn format, while regional and country taxis use TC·nnnn. As of October 2009, the Taxi plate design has changed to its current format following enforcement camera errors showing the zeros or eights between the character spaces. It has an embossed premium slimline at the top with sticker for LPG, CNG and TPG moved to two bottom corners. The white on blue reflective base remain the same. NSW -TAXI is the legend description. Taxi licensing is being reformed as per the Point to Point Transport reforms that would mean all existing taxi licensing will be cancelled and then a new taxi licence to be issued. As of 27 August 2026, a new taxi plate colour scheme has been rolled out in black on light blue colour. The embossing style remains the same.
- Tow truck plates use nnnn·TT or nnnn·TT and as of March 2018 123-TTT was seen on a table top tow truck nnn·TTT depending on the registered use of the vehicle. They have blue characters on a white background, and the top of the plate reads "TOW TRUCK", that was introduced in October 2000. The original yellow on black format with NSW The First state or Towards 2000 began in November 1990. It is now in the current NEW SOUTH WALES format and is seen to have 9906-TT as of 28 March 2008. As of September 2008 it is in 9800s series, but now it is issued in 7000 to 8999 unused blocks as the first one 7002-TT was seen at the Northern Beaches as of December 2008. As of week ending 5 September 2025, a new next generation plate with an embossed full integrated identifier pressed into base surface has been available under this tow truck category, for EV & H for Hydrogen vehicles. As of Mid 2026, TT plates went back to issuing cancelled blocks starting at 1000-TT.
- Buses have black on yellow plates, with the prefix Metro: M/O·nnnn, Country: nnnn·MO (Motor Omnibus) Commercial buses in Sydney, Newcastle and Wollongong districts have M/O-nnnn plates, with the M over the O; all other country commercial buses use nnnn-MO. Like other vehicles, buses not used for hire or reward are registered with National Heavy Vehicle plates. The M/O·6nnn series was reserved for the Wollongong region, but now cancelled M/O 6000s series are re-issued to private buses in Sydney, which continues from M/O·5nnn series and into 8000s as of June 2019.It went back to 1000 MO as of 2025. As of week ending 5 September 2025, a new next generation plate with an embossed full integrated identifier pressed into base surface has been available under this Metropolitan and country bus category, for EV & H for Hydrogen vehicles. First M/O metropolitan EV embossed plates began to appear on Sydney and Newcastle buses since April 2026. They are issued to electric buses only. Also it went back from M/O 1000 onwards reissuing cancelled series.
- Tourist vehicles have black on yellow plates, with the prefix TV·nnna. Originally issued as yellow on black TV·nnn plates in the 1960s, before changed to reflective black on yellow format in the early 1980s. At the time the tourist coach market was heavily regulated with a finite number of TV plates on issue, making them like taxi plates a traded commodity. As of September 2018 it has reached TV-9999 and is reissuing cancelled blocks from TV-1000 onwards. Starting on 2 October 2019, new TV series commenced at TV-001A using last alpha suffix in place of numerical. As of week ending 5 September 2025, a new next generation plate with an embossed full integrated identifier pressed into base surface has been available under this TV category, for EV & H for Hydrogen vehicles.
- Police and emergency vehicles in New South Wales, such as ambulances and police vehicles, are using aaa-nna slimline plates for cars. Some police vehicles have had personalised plates fitted, for example several Highway Patrol vehicles have plates featuring the HWP series from 1975 and in recent decades the initials of officers killed on duty. During the 2010s HWP series were allocated to Police HWP motorcycles and VIP series during the 2000s, that continues to today. NSW Ambulance plates in 1937 had AC series plates allocated for the duration of the original AA-000 to ZZ-999 series. From the 1960s CDA series plates were allocated to Central District Ambulances in Sydney but no longer in use as was phased out in the 1980s.New South Wales Rural Fire Service vehicles were exempted from displaying registration plates, however some have been fitted with standard issue plates. New South Wales Fire Brigades vehicles were at one stage only fitted with brass plates featuring the letters "NSWFB". These plates were red on gold brass and from 1984, NSWFB plates were pressed into standard dies in gold and red base. It was withdrawn from 1991 when FBY-000 to FBY-999 was allocated that lasted until 2010 when it was replaced by the standard series. Fire trucks in NSW are now allocated the National Heavy Vehicle plates series while the auxiliary light vehicle continues to be allocated NSW general series yellow plates.
- Conditional Registration Scheme nnnnn·E Conditional Motorcycle format: nnnn·N Forklift, Off-Road Vehicles, etc., that need to use public roads as part of their operation can be registered conditionally. As of June 2008, it is reported that the motorcycle sized series has overflowed to 0001-C onwards after reaching 9999-C then moved onto M and N suffix. By December 2021 15000-E suffix Conditional Plates are the latest issues. nnnn·U for machinery/tractors commenced in December 2013 starting as T suffix to balance between existing Conditional and Machinery/Tractors types. As of May 2018, it moved to U suffix series. As of July 2024, screen printed legend was changed to embossed version. As of week ending 5 September 2025, a new next generation plate with an embossed full integrated identifier pressed into base surface has been available under this category, for EV & H for Hydrogen vehicles.
- Classic Vehicle or Classic Cycle plates: nnnnn·F Introduced effective 1 July 2024, with the slogan NSW – Classic Vehicle.
- Classic Cycle plates: nnnn·D Introduced effective 1 July 2024, with the slogan NSW – Classic Cycle.
- Rally vehicle plates: nnnnn·R Introduced in 2014, with the slogan NSW – Rally Vehicle.
- Historic and veteran vehicles Cars – nnnnn·J Cycles – nnnn·L Introduced in 2002 starting with 00000·H and into current J series . For vehicles used/registered for historical interest and not used as regular transport by financial members of an approved club and is classed as a conditional registration. As of May 2024, screen printed legend was changed to embossed version.
- Trade plates (current): in the format Annnn or nnnnA . Permanent trade plates have replaced white on orange annual trade plates effective 23 December 2015, with an embossed NSW and screened "Trade" legend: NSW – Trade. The RMS commenced issuing new style yellow perpetual trader plates during the 31 December 2015 renewal process. The following content ranges are reserved for the new style trader's plates:

- A0000 to A9999 for vehicles.
- 0000A to 5999A for trailers—available from January 2017—using full premium embossed dies.
- 6000A to 9999A for motorcycles. Available from January 2017—using slimline embossed dies format and 5 character base that was later replaced by motorcycle sized plates following feedback from dealers.
- This clarifies the allocation of trailer and motorcycle plates as B-series motorcycle trade plates have been discontinued and replaced by the allocation of 6000A to 9999A series. Trailers have moved to 0000A to 5999A replacing the three numeric blocks. This previous permanent arrangement existed from 1991 to 2003 in colour as shown: A·nnnn.

- CC Consular Plates – CC·nnnn Special purpose plates are used for consular corps since 1978 in CC-2000 to CC-4999 range, initially in white on blue then changed to black on yellow by August 1983, with the same legend at top NSW CONSULAR CORPS. The legend moved from top to the bottom from changeover to fat dies in October 1992 and since the variations of dies and bases were updated on a few occasions to the current style. A motorcycle version is also produced and is only into 200 series, only two have been issued. CC·2nn As of week ending 5 September 2025, a new next generation plate with an embossed full integrated identifier pressed into base surface has been available under this category, for EV & H for Hydrogen vehicles.
- Visit to New South Wales: It is a red numerical only visit plates similar to the Commonwealth of Australia with inscription at top Visit to and bottom as New South Wales with the graphical state coat of arms at left side.

== Other purpose plates ==
- NSW Auxiliary A supplementary plate to be displayed on a bike rack or other kind of racks displaying the duplicate number/alpha combination was introduced in October 1995, initially in black on off white non reflective and screenprinted legend as "NSW – BIKE RACK" . In 1998 it changed to black on reflective white, again on screenprinted legend. In 1999 the legend changed to embossed. In 2006 the legend reverted to full screen printed. In 2012 the name was changed to "NSW- AUXILIARY" again in screen printed. in 2016, the arrangements extended to tow trucks and other vehicles covered in this scheme and in December the legend was revised to add embossed NSW and the rest screen printed. As of October 2022, it once changed again back to the full embossed legend moving forward being the 7th version since its inception in 1995.

== Discontinued plates ==
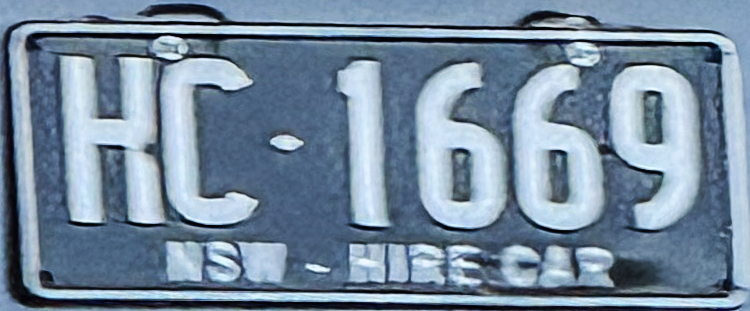
Hire car

MyPlates products and special short term plates:

- V8 Supercar plates: have been removed from sale effective 22 July 2019.
- Bright lights: AAA·nnn AAA·nnn AAA·nnn AAA·nnn AAA·nnn AAA·nnn AAA·nnn
- Prestige: Introduced in 2009 as v1.0 as premium typeface fonts then updated to v2.0 with typeface fonts changed to standard dies fonts. Discontinued circa June 2018.
- Bicentenary 1788-1988 : Introduced November 1987 and discontinued after the quota 200,000 orders/issues reached.
- RSL Range : 1998 only
- Centenary series : Available during 2001 and is still offering remakes, but no new orders are taken.
- New England Regional : 2001 to 2004. For the New England Region only, other regional options were explored but it was decided not to continue.
- Sydney 2000 Olympics: Introduced in May 1998, slimline added July 1999 and then discontinued from 31 December 2000.

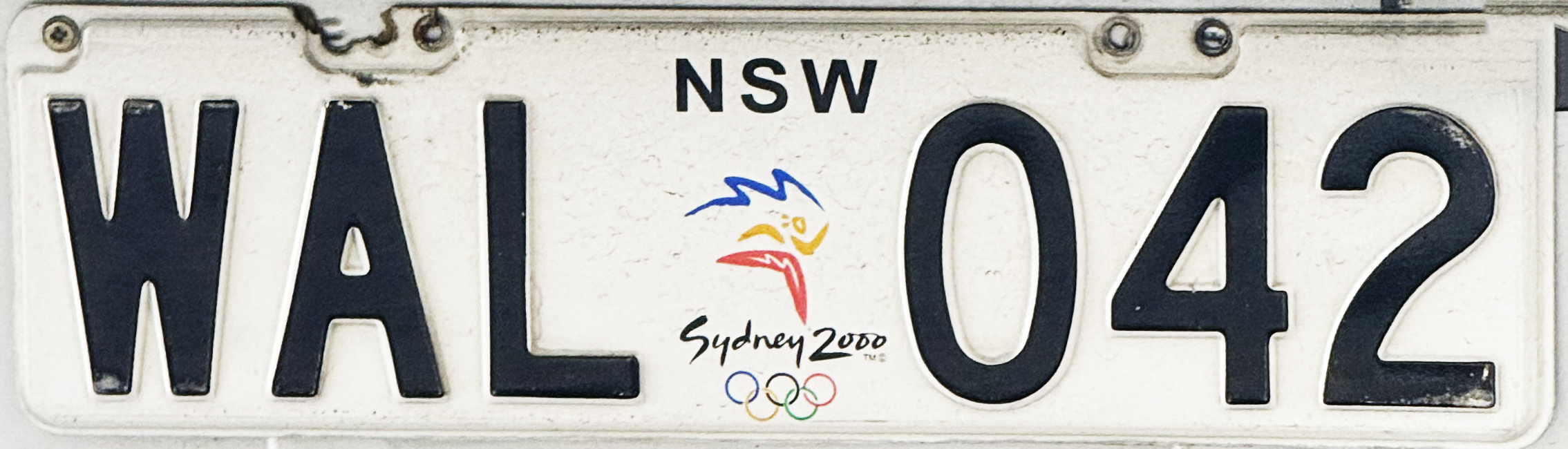
Slimline Sydney 2000 Olympics

- My Plates Range A number of selections in My Plates range have been removed from 1 July 2021, the entire range of Zodiac, Serenity & Soccer A League were removed and some selected colour & theme ranges were reduced. State of Origin were withdrawn in February 2022. Further colour withdrawals occurred during November 2024, all black on colour range removed and selected colour background on white ranges removed were Deep purple, Vivid Blue, Hot Pink and Burnt Orange except motorcycles which retained the Burnt orange colour option.Wanderlust plates have been withdrawn from sale except trailer options.
- Retro range was withdrawn in September 2025.
- Ford 100th Anniversary option is soon to be discontinued as of March 2026.

Specialised series blocks in either previous styles or discontinued combinations:

- Slogan plates: 1980–1988 NSW-THE PREMIER STATE, 1989-1994 NSW-THE FIRST STATE and 1994-1996 NSW-TOWARDS 2000
- Previous trade plates style since 1910 as known as agent's plates, in the a-nnn format was standard porcelain white on black until 1937 when it changed to very large page embossed dies in an annual non standard colour until 1952.
  From 1952, the annual cyclic colour scheme was introduced, red, purple, brown, green, orange and blue for all annual trade plates and stickers but the embossed style remained until 1959.
  From 1959 the year was added on top of NSW as the format showed as 19 NSW 59 and runs from A-0000 to A-9999.
  By 1982, the design was changed, the year moved to the left hand side in vertical, and the dies format changed to standard car size as the previous very large dies was used from 1937.
  In 1991, it changed to permanent trade plates with trade word replacing the year, colour changed to white on dark green and ran until 2004 when it was replaced by the current format trade plates with year & bottom legend—NSW TRADE screenprinted & a change to the premium dies
- Light or heavy vehicles or trailers A-nnnn or nnnn-A formats.
- Cycles are in either B-nnnn or nnnn-B formats.

nnnn-A/nnn-B	Colour	A-nnnn/B-nnn	Colour
2004	nnnn·A	2005	A·nnnn
2006	nnnn·A	2007	A·nnnn
2008	nnnn·A	2009	A·nnnn
2010	nnnn·A	2011	A·nnnn
2012	nnnn·A	2013	A·nnnn
2014	nnnn·A	2015	– Perm

- Motorcycle trade plates (B-series): issued from 1958 to 2015. These were initially issued in annual cyclic colours, then from 1991 to 2004 permanent trade plates were issued with white text on a green base. The last issued combinations were B·nnn or nnn·B from 2004 to 2015.
- Hire Cars HC·nnnn HC-000 to 999 issued in Sydney but now extends beyond HC-1000 since 2008. HC-2000 to HC- 4999 blocks are issued outside Sydney. Previously until 1998, HV-nnn series were issued in the country but had to combine into a single HC series. Effective from the week of 29 July 2013, new HC plates design were released—in same white on reflective black with legend NSW-HIRE CAR starting with HC-1927. As of 18 December 2015 the HC series has been discontinued and won't be issued to new drivers as it is no longer required when Hire Car drivers require a new service. Remakes or replacement are still available on request but as of July 2026 TfNSW has stopped remakes of damaged or stolen HC plates.
- Motor van: V·nnnn V series began as a motor van plates until 1939 when it changed to large page dies then into black on reflective yellow The Premier State from 1983 until it was discontinued in 1985 and was recalled.
- Lorry series: L·nn-nnn Issued from 1910 until 1937 when it was replaced by the general series. All have been recalled.
- Interstate visitors: B·nnnn B0series were used for interstate visitors in the 1920s to register interstate visitors to NSW and vice versa in their own states registration schemes. It was discontinued after only 2 years. The B series were later adopted by motorcycles dealer plates.
- Interstate series: ISA·nnn 1953–1987. It began in the ISA-to-ISZ blocks and used for trucks and trailers. In April 1982, it changed to red in reflective white in The Premier State slogan. In January 1987, it was replaced by the Federal Interstate Registration Scheme.
- Country HV hire cars: HV·nnnn HV-nnn series were issued in the country until 1998 when it had to combine into a single HC 4000 series.
- Early hire cars: H·nnnn Issued from the 1910s until 1939 when it was replaced by the current HC-nnn series.
- Country MO prefix: MO·nnnn The prefix series commenced in 1939 and was replaced in 2008 with the current suffix series nnnn-MO
- Historic and veteran vehicles Cars – nnnn Cycles – nnn From 1959 to 2002 there were 4 numeral for cars & 3 numerals for motorcycles in colours specific to the issuing club . Each club issued plates in numerical order from 0001 for cars & 001 for motorcycles with plate 0000 remaining at the manufacturer ( Pages) for colour matching. Thus there was multiple vehicles with the same numbers but in different colours. The plates had to be used in conjunction with a name bar stating the name of the issuing club displayed directly above the plate which had Vintage Car, Veteran Car Vintage Cycle or Veteran Cycle stamped above the letters . They were withdrawn from use in 2002 and the current H series is in use. For vehicles used/registered for historical interest and not used as regular transport by financial members of an approved club.
- Roads & Traffic Authority: vehicles use plates in RTA·000 RTB·000 and RTC·000 format, some plates are in coloured slimline or wallaby formats. Recently, there were no more combinations, so standard plates will be used on new vehicles. The Roads & Traffic Authority has been abolished and replaced by the Roads & Maritime Services.
- Fire & Rescue New South Wales: FRNSW vehicles used to be registered in the FBY·nnn series, but now both administrative and operational firefighting vehicles are now using AB-12-CD general issues, to reduce budget expenditure.
- NSW Government buses – nnnn·ST 2008-2022 (State Transit buses) nnnn·ST Yellow based used in error 2018.The M/O·1000 to M/O·3999 range was reserved for the State Transit Authority and its predecessors but now issued to private buses since the start of ST series. When the end of the series was reached in the early 1970s the series was reissued before again being exhausted again in 2000. Some plates were reissued for a third time before the State Transit Authority adopted its own nnnn·ST series from 2008. In March 2018 the base colour issued to one bus has the yellow NEW SOUTH WALES legend made in error. The ST series ceased with the last 3129ST issued to Custom Denning Element bus in March 2022.
- CdeC Consular Plates – CdeC·nnn In 1941 the CdeC plates series commenced and ran until 1978 showing the format as CdeC-nnn. CdeC has a shield with the letters inside and was white on blue. A similar format has been used in Qld, NT, & WA.
- Yellow "general series" personalised plates: ABC·nnn From the mid-1970s personalised plates into the yellow general series format began and then later into the Premier State, First State and Towards 2000 era then into New South Wales reflective yellow. It briefly stopped in 2003 and was reinstated in 2006 for 3 years until it was finally discontinued. In 2013 it was reintroduced but in black and yolk yellow base 1951–1980 style. This original NEW SOUTH WALES yellow style continues to be offered as a remake only to both personalised and general series.

== Registration labels ==
From 1932, registration labels were introduced which corresponded to the vehicle's registration plate, and were displayed on the windscreen or side-windows of vehicles.
The label was a wet application type soaked in cold water which was then applied to the glass, then squeegeed with a clean sponge to remove remaining gum on the label. It was time-consuming. In 1992, it changed to self-adhesive printed on registration certificates and continues for heavy vehicles after the abolition of labels for light vehicles.
1932 to 1953 – Non standard annual colours were used
1953 to 2018 – Annual cyclic colours of red, purple, brown, green, orange and light blue.(Heavy vehicles only from 1 January 2013)

Design changes

- 1932–1957 – Month in the middle and particular details on both sides of label and NEW SOUTH WALES with government crest at top.
- 1957–1959 – Month in the middle and particular details on bottom of label and NEW SOUTH WALES with government crest at top while VEHICLE REGISTRATION LABEL at bottom.
- 1960–1973 – Redesigned label showing month in middle, particular details on top of label and NEW SOUTH WALES at the right hand side & Date of expiry at left hand side.
- 1973–1984 – Redesigned label showing month in middle, particular details on top of label on one line only and NEW SOUTH WALES moved to the top & Date of expiry moved to right hand side.
- 1984–1987 – Redesigned label showing month & year in left hand side, particular details deleted and NEW SOUTH WALES remain at top with annual graphic designs of the Sydney Opera House, Parkes Observatory, Queen Victoria Building and Australian Bicentenary.
- 1988 – Redesigned label showing NEW SOUTH WALES, month and year in right hand side and Australian Bicentenary logo.
- 1989–1992 – Redesigned half size label showing NEW SOUTH WALES, month & year in full middle alignment.
- 1992–2012 – Adhesive sticker label with vehicle details reinstated in yellow L-shaped area.
- 1 January 2013 – Registration labels abolished for light vehicles – cars, trailers, cycles and caravans.
- 1 July 2018 – Registration labels abolished for heavy vehicles and conditional registration. Last to be abolished.
