= Fire and Rescue New South Wales =

Emergency service in New South Wales, Australia

Fire and Rescue NSW
- New South Wales Fire Brigade
- Crest

- Flag

Operational area
- Country: Australia
- State: New South Wales
- Address: 1 Amarina Ave, Greenacre, New South Wales, Australia

Agency overview
- Established: 14 February 1884
- Annual calls: 130,558 (2022–23)
- Employees: 3,605 Permanent (Full-time) Firefighters; 3,212 Retained (Part-time) Firefighters; 4,657 Community Fire Unit Volunteers
- Staffing: 465 Administrative and Trades Staff
- Commissioner: Jeremy Fewtrell AFSM
- Motto: Orta Recens Quam Pura Nites (Newly Risen, How Brightly We Shine)

Facilities and equipment
- Stations: 335
- Engines: 399
- Rescues: 11
- HAZMAT: 18
- Aerial Pumpers: 13
- Aerial Ladder Platforms: 13

Website
- www.fire.nsw.gov.au

Fire and Rescue NSW (FRNSW), previously known as NSW Fire Brigades (NSWFB), is a statutory agency of the New South Wales Government and the primary provider of fire and rescue services in New South Wales, Australia. FRNSW is responsible for fire suppression, rescue operations and hazardous materials response in the major cities, metropolitan areas and regional centres throughout the state. It is the fourth-largest urban fire service in the world, with over 6,800 firefighters serving at 335 fire stations, supported by 465 administrative and trades staff and 5,700 community fire unit volunteers. FRNSW are the busiest fire service in Australia, attending over 124,000 incidents per year.

The service operates under the Fire and Rescue Act 1989. The organisation has a substantial history dating back well over 100 years to the establishment of Metropolitan Fire Brigade in 1884, and the New South Wales Fire Brigades in 1910. The organisation is led by the Commissioner of Fire and Rescue NSW, Jeremy Fewtrell, appointed on the 30th of October, 2023.

== History ==
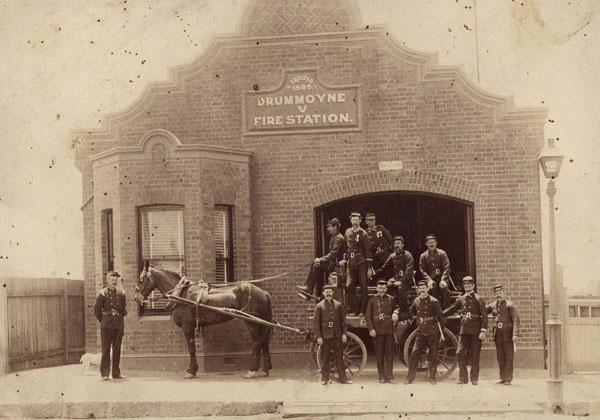
Drummoyne firefighters circa 1890s

Early firefighting efforts in New South Wales were made up of a number of small insurance and volunteer based fire brigades located predominantly around central Sydney. Following a series of major fires, most notably the Garden Palace Fire in 1882, firefighting in Sydney was formalised into one organisation on 14 February 1884, the Metropolitan Fire Brigade (MFB). The MFB initially operated out of the former Insurance Brigade Headquarters on Bathurst Street, but soon began to seek new locations for expansion. The first station opened by the MFB was No. 3 Stanmore (initially known as Marrickville) in 1886. This was soon followed by the construction of their new Headquarters on Castlereagh Street (No. 1 Station) in 1888, which remains New South Wales' oldest operational fire station to this day.

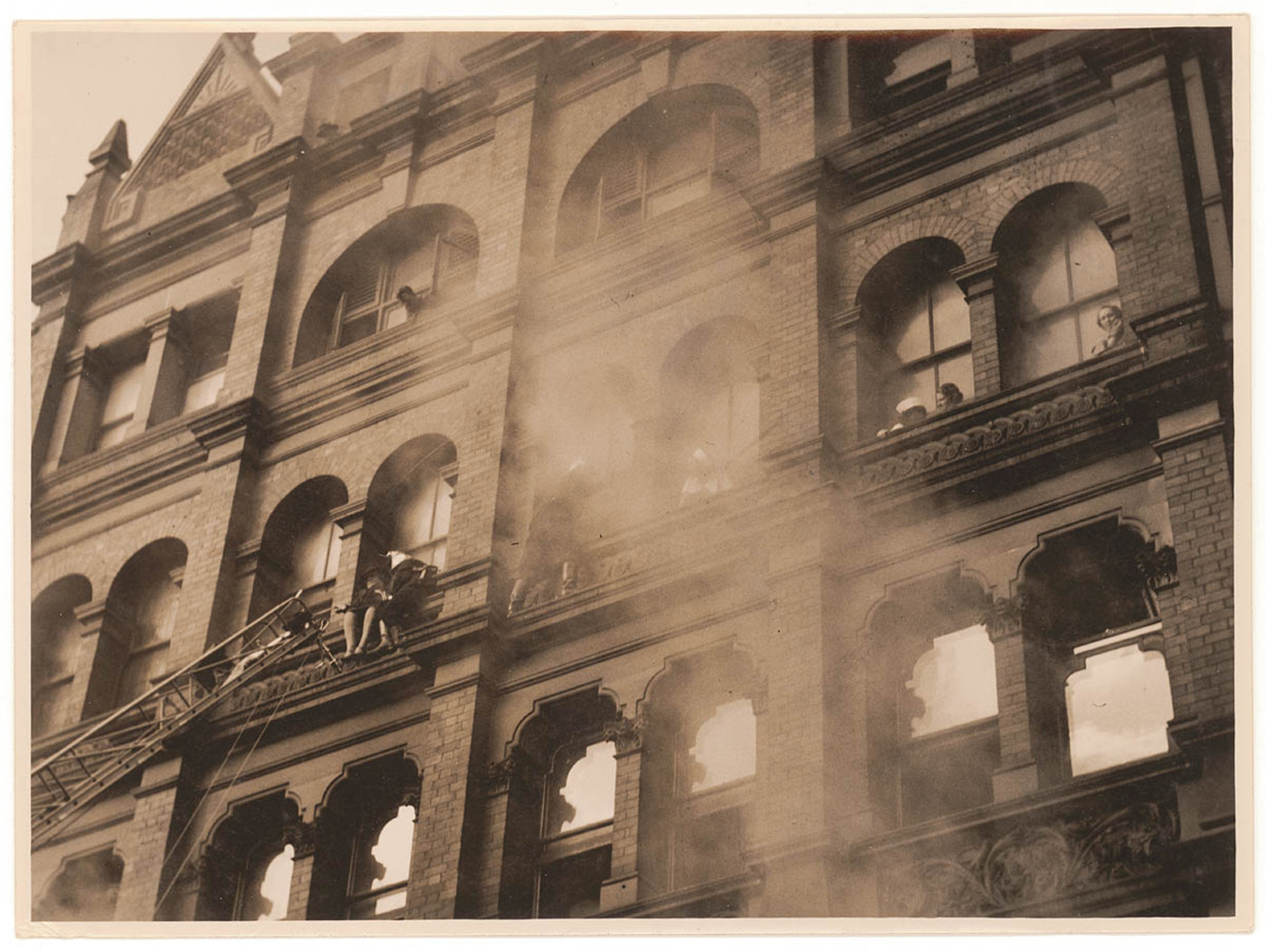
A rescue operation, 1930s

In 1910, the Fire Brigades Act was extended to cover not just Sydney but the entire state of New South Wales. The Metropolitan Fire Brigade as a result became the New South Wales Fire Brigades (NSWFB). The organisation continued to grow, with many towns across the state seeking to establish permanent fire services often after major fires of their own. The NSWFB's expansion continued through the early 20th century. The Brigades soon became responsible for hundreds of stations and thousands of firefighters even despite significant post-war cuts in 1945.

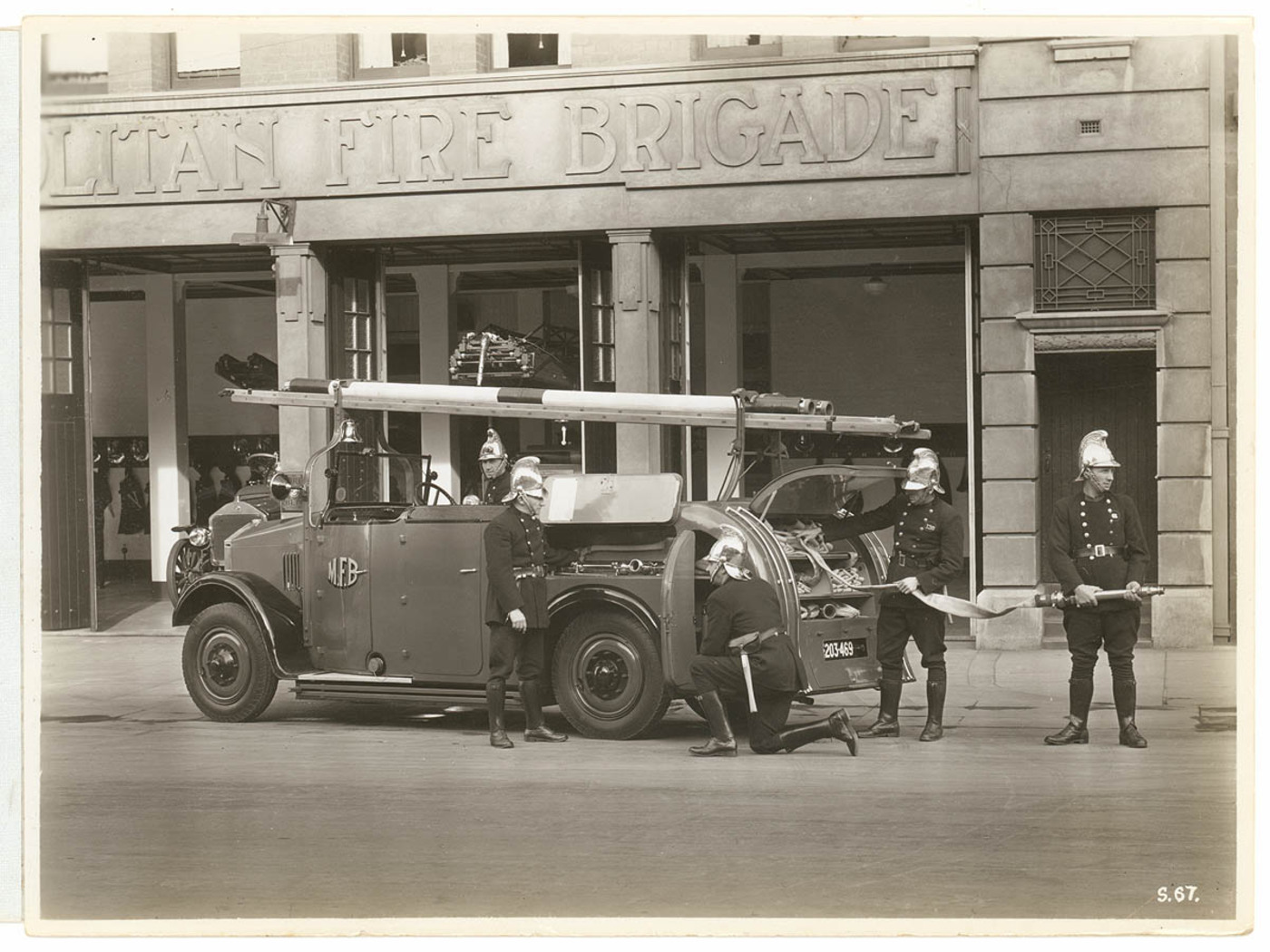
Metropolitan Fire Brigade on Castlereagh Street in the 1940s

Through the mid to late 20th century, NSWFB firefighters faced some of the most dangerous and deadly emergencies in the state's history, including the 1979 Luna Park Ghost Train Fire, the 1977 Granville Rail Disaster, the 1981 Sylvania Heights Nursing Home Fire, the 1981 Rembrandt Hostel Fire, the 1989 Downunder Hostel Fire and the 1989 Newcastle Earthquake, along with countless major bushfire emergencies including the 1968, 1974/75, 1979 and 1980 bushfire seasons.

The 1990s and early 2000s saw significant changes in the NSWFB and in firefighting as a whole. Development in training and equipment saw the more widespread use of Breathing Apparatus and Thermal Imaging Cameras, along with improved Personal Protective Equipment and more modern appliances. In 1991, NSWFB took over primary rescue response from the NSW Police in a number of areas in Sydney. This saw a shift in the brigade, as they began to increase their capabilities in technical and specialist rescue. This period also saw a number of major emergencies across the state, including the 1991 Palm Grove Hostel Fire, the 1994 Bushfires, the 1995 Speed Street Fire, the 1997 Thredbo Landslide, the 1997 Bushfires, the 1999 Glenbrook Train Derailment, the 1999 Sydney Hailstorm, the 2001 Bushfires, the 2002/03 Bushfires, the 2003 Waterfall rail accident and the 2006 Bushfires.

In 2011, following the brigade taking over primary rescue services from NSW Ambulance in Sydney, Newcastle and Wollongong, the New South Wales Fire Brigades was renamed Fire and Rescue NSW (FRNSW), to better reflect its increasing rescue responsibilities. There was also a focus on further development of Personal Protective Equipment. New protective clothing featured a Nomex and Kevlar blend called Titan, combined with an inner moisture barrier to prevent steam burns in 2013. New MSA and Pac Fire Firefighting and General Purpose Helmets were introduced in 2015, MSA Breathing Apparatus sets in 2017, flash hoods and firefighting gloves in 2018. In 2016, FRNSW rolled out Mobile Data Terminals to every station to improve firefighter access to information including resources, call details, advanced maps, weather radars and data sheets.

In 2016, FRNSW relocated their Headquarters to a brand new building at Greenacre, which serves as a modern workspace for both operational and administrative staff. This was followed in 2018 by the construction of the new Emergency Services Academy in Orchard Hills, which provides firefighters with a modern practical learning environment to maintain and improve safety and skills. In 2018, FRNSW rolled out the ‘Plus Plan’, an organisational strategy to develop an internal model for success and community education with an emphasis on these new roles and technologies.The Plus Plan delivered many new initiatives to update and modernise the organisation including: Community Education on the wider role of FRNSW including fire + rescue + hazmat + natural disaster and humanitarian response + counter terrorism + protecting the environment + medical response + prevention and education. It also brought in the huge update of technology and safety with the “connected firefighter program” the carcinogen exposure reduction program including implementation of the worlds first ppe exchange laundering service using the “pizza box” system. It also drew funding to replace the entire bushfire tanker fleet following the Black Christmas bushfire crisis and also the achievement of funding to upgrade the aerial firefighting fleet including the introduction of the new 45 metre Bronto platforms and 11 new state of the art aerial pumpers. It also sought and achieved funding to greatly enhance the organisation’s water rescue capability in response to flooding emergency the state experienced in 2021/22. The Plus Plan also introduced a comprehensive program to create a more inclusive and diverse workplace and increased mental health resilience programs and internal support capability for mental health support to frontline crews with the introduction of its own clinical psychologists. It also added to the newly opened training academy by introducing new simulation technology, realistic interior fire training including multi-story training resources, an urban search and rescue scenario based facility and a large scale logistics and deployment centre. It also saw a huge investment in RPAS, or drones, with greatly increased capabilities in fire, rescue, hazmat and mapping support rolled out across the state. FRNSW have been working to incorporate further new technologies into their fleet, including the development of their two high tech Mobile Command Centres as part of the connected firefighter program., the incorporation of Compressed Air Foam Systems into their appliances, the implementation of a remote Turbine Assisted Firefighting Unit, the development of the Hytrans Bulk Water Transfer System, and the development of Remote Piloted Aircraft systems.

== Emblem ==
The Fire and Rescue NSW emblem includes the NSW state emblem with the State motto Orta Recens Quam Pura Nites, which is Latin for 'Newly Risen How Brightly We Shine'.

A flag based on the British Blue Ensign with the FRNSW emblem is the official pennant.

== Ranks ==
Firefighters

Rank	Commissioner	Deputy Commissioner	Assistant Commissioner	Chief Superintendent	Superintendent	Inspector	Leading Station Officer	Station Officer	Leading Firefighter	Senior Firefighter; 15 years service	Senior Firefighter	Qualified Firefighter	Firefighter Level 2 (Probationary)	Firefighter Level 1 (Probationary)	Recruit
Insignia													No Epaulettes (Number 2 displayed on sides of helmet)	No Epaulettes (Number 1 displayed on sides of helmet)	

Retained firefighters

Rank	Retained Captain	Retained Deputy Captain	Retained Firefighter; 15 years service	Retained Firefighter; 10 years service	Retained Firefighter; 5 years service	Retained Firefighter	Recruit
Insignia						No Insignia	Both Recruit and Student epaulettes used

=== Commissioner ===
The Commissioner's official vehicle bears number plate 10, which has been on continuous issue to the head of the fire department from Transport for NSW and its predecessors since 1910.

Jeremy Fewtrell AFSM was appointed Fire and Rescue NSW Commissioner on the 30th of October 2023. He previously served as Deputy Commissioner.

Name	Title	Term start	Term end	Time in office	Notes
Vice Admiral Ian MacDougall AC AFSM	Commissioner	10 June 1994	4 July 2003	9 years, 24 days	
Greg Mullins AO AFSM	Commissioner	4 July 2003	6 January 2017	13 years, 186 days	
Paul Baxter QSO	Commissioner	16 January 2017	17 July 2023	9 years, 310 days	
Jeremy Fewtrell AFSM	Commissioner	30 October 2023	Present	3 years, 23 days	

== Organisation ==
=== Staffing ===
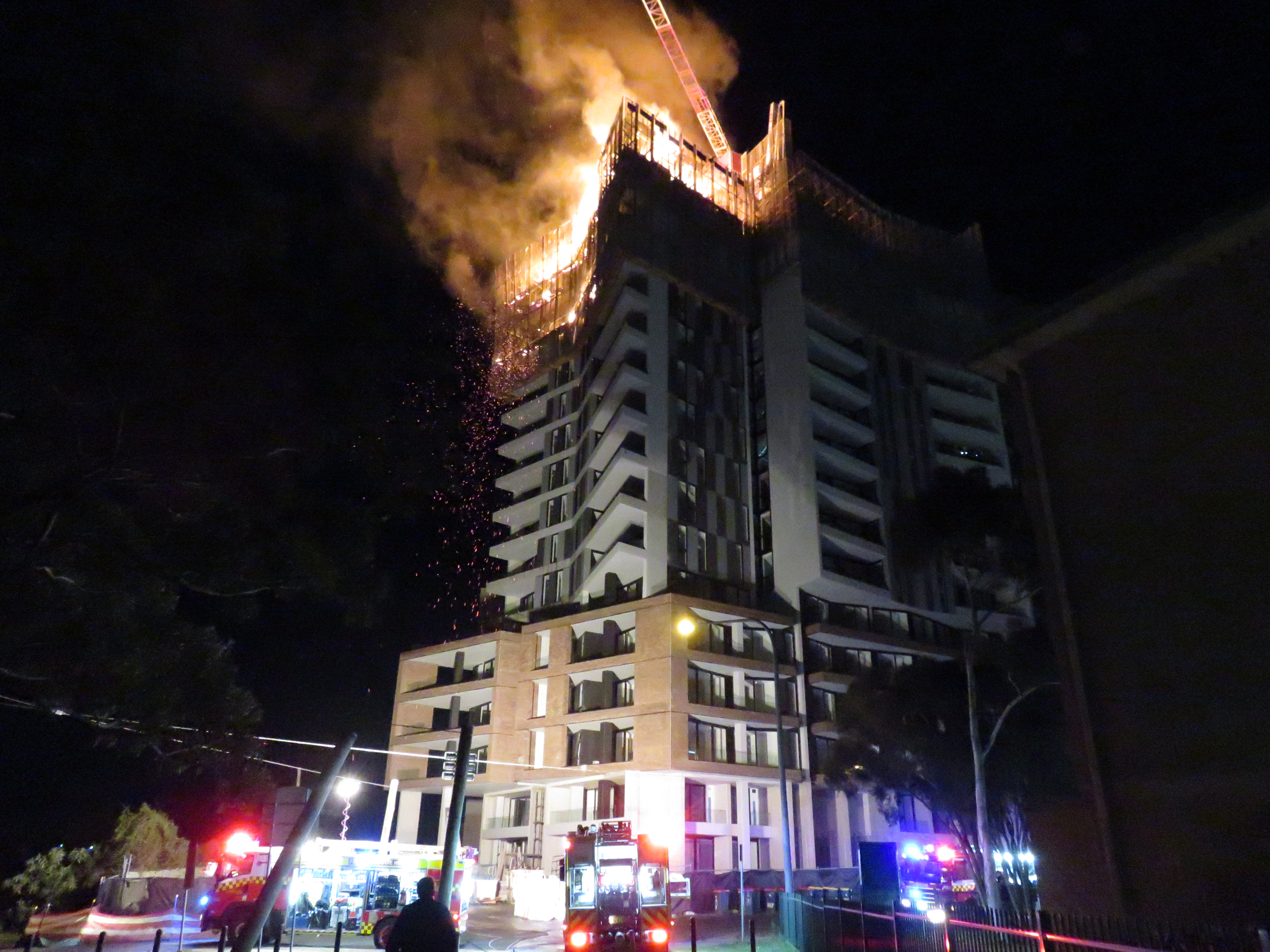
Firefighters battle a major high rise fire in South West Sydney

Fire and Rescue NSW operate two levels of staffing, permanent and retained. Permanent firefighters are full-time career crews who work predominantly 24 hour shifts. Each permanent station is made up of four platoons, A B C & D. Each station is assigned a minimum of one Pumper with a crew of 4 firefighters and a station officer per shift. Some multi appliance stations such as City of Sydney can have as many as 20 firefighters on a platoon. Permanent stations are typically located in metropolitan areas (Such as Sydney and Newcastle) and regional centres (Such as Lismore and Dubbo).

Retained firefighters are part-time on call crews, who are notified by pager and travel to the fire station from home or work when an emergency occurs. Retained firefighters are predominantly located in outer metropolitan and regional areas. Retained firefighters operate off an availability roster, where each firefighter has to give their available hours for the day/week. This system ensures that there is always a minimum safe crew of four retained firefighters available to turnout at any given time. A number of stations, particularly in regional areas, have a mix of both permanent and retained crews, who work together and often provide backup for one another.

=== Zones ===
Stations in New South Wales are organised geographically, often by region, into zones which are spread around the state. A zone consists of between 10 and 20 stations. Every station is staffed by a platoon. The platoon of every station is run by a Duty Commander, who not only manages the platoon but responds operationally as a commander to emergencies within the zone. Each zone then has an overall Zone Commander, who manages on a zone based level. Three zones then make up an area, which is managed by an Area Commander. In New South Wales there are 21 zones which form 7 areas.

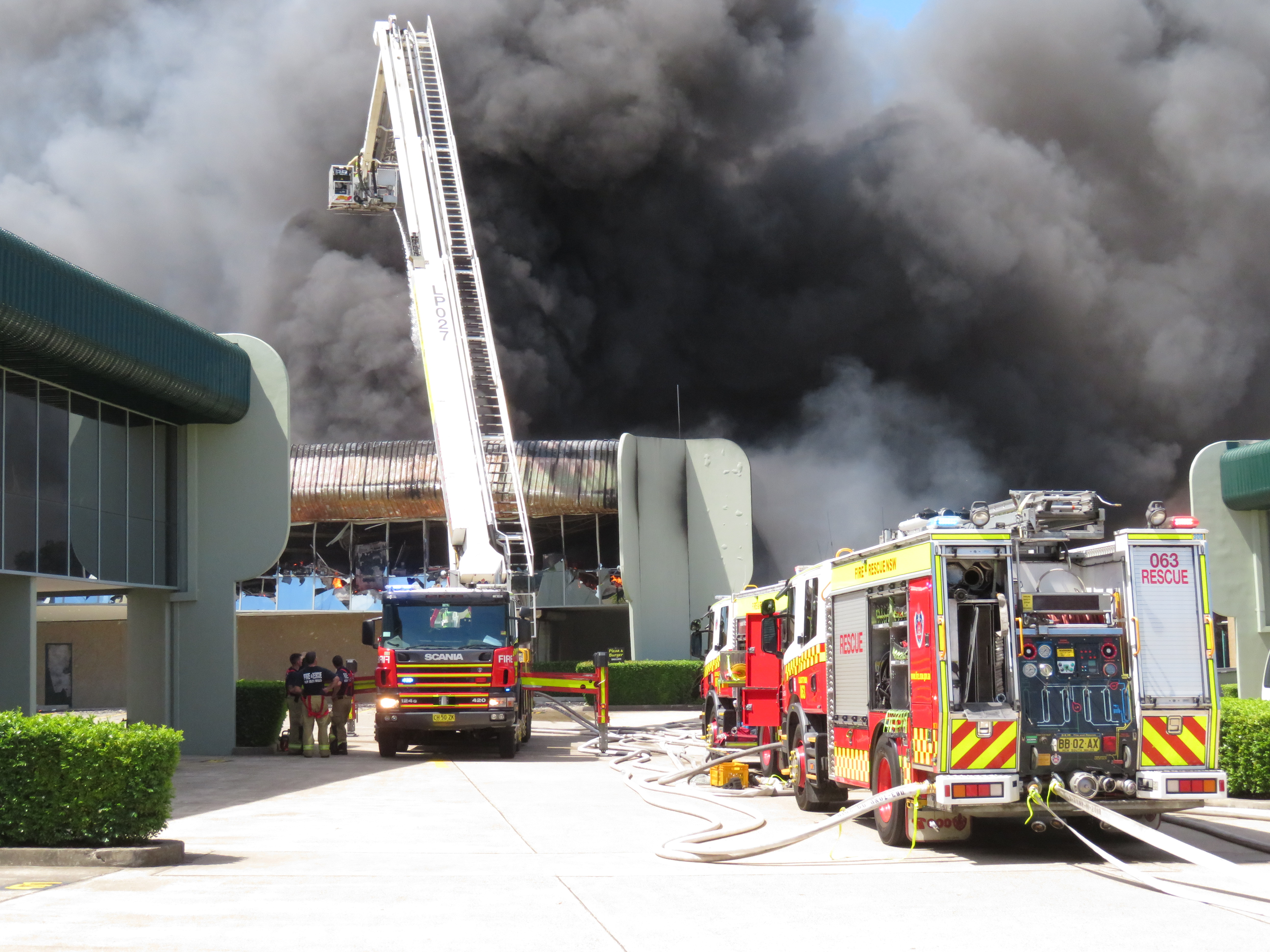
Firefighters battle a 9th Alarm Factory Fire

The 7 areas are split between metropolitan and regional. The Metro Areas report to the Assistant Commissioner of Metropolitan Operations, whilst the Regional Areas report to the Assistant Commissioner of Regional Operations. Both of these officers then report to the Deputy Commissioner of Field Operations, who in turn reports to the Commissioner. This tiered system means that management can be tailored at each level to suit local operational needs.

=== Specialist Sections ===
Fire and Rescue NSW operate a number of specialist operational and support sections including;

Operational Communications – Responsible for Triple Zero call taking, dispatch and emergency communications, operating out of two Communications Centres at Alexandria and Newcastle.

Fire Investigation and Research – Responsible for investigating the cause and origin of fires (including the operation of Australia's first accelerant detection dogs), as well as research into fire behaviour and fire dynamics, who operate out of their base at Greenacre and their research centre at Londonderry.

Community and Fire Safety – Responsible for increasing community and business resilience to emergencies through community education as well as in the field assessments and inspections.

Education and Training – Responsible for providing education and training for firefighters, utilising the Emergency Services Academy at Orchard Hills.

Capability Management – Responsible for developing and enhancing Fire and Rescue's operational capabilities, including Firefighting, Rescue, HazMat, Incident Management and others.

Specialised Operations – Responsible for managing Fire and Rescue's Rescue, USAR, HazMat, Bushfire and Aviation Sections. They run from a number of locations, mainly the Specialised Operations Centre at the Orchard Hills Academy.

Logistics – Responsible for equipment management and distribution, and the management and maintenance of Fire and Rescue's vehicle fleet and property infrastructure.

FRNSW operate a number of other specialist support sections that include Finance, Governance and Legal, Information and Technology, People and Culture. These functions support frontline firefighters and operations.

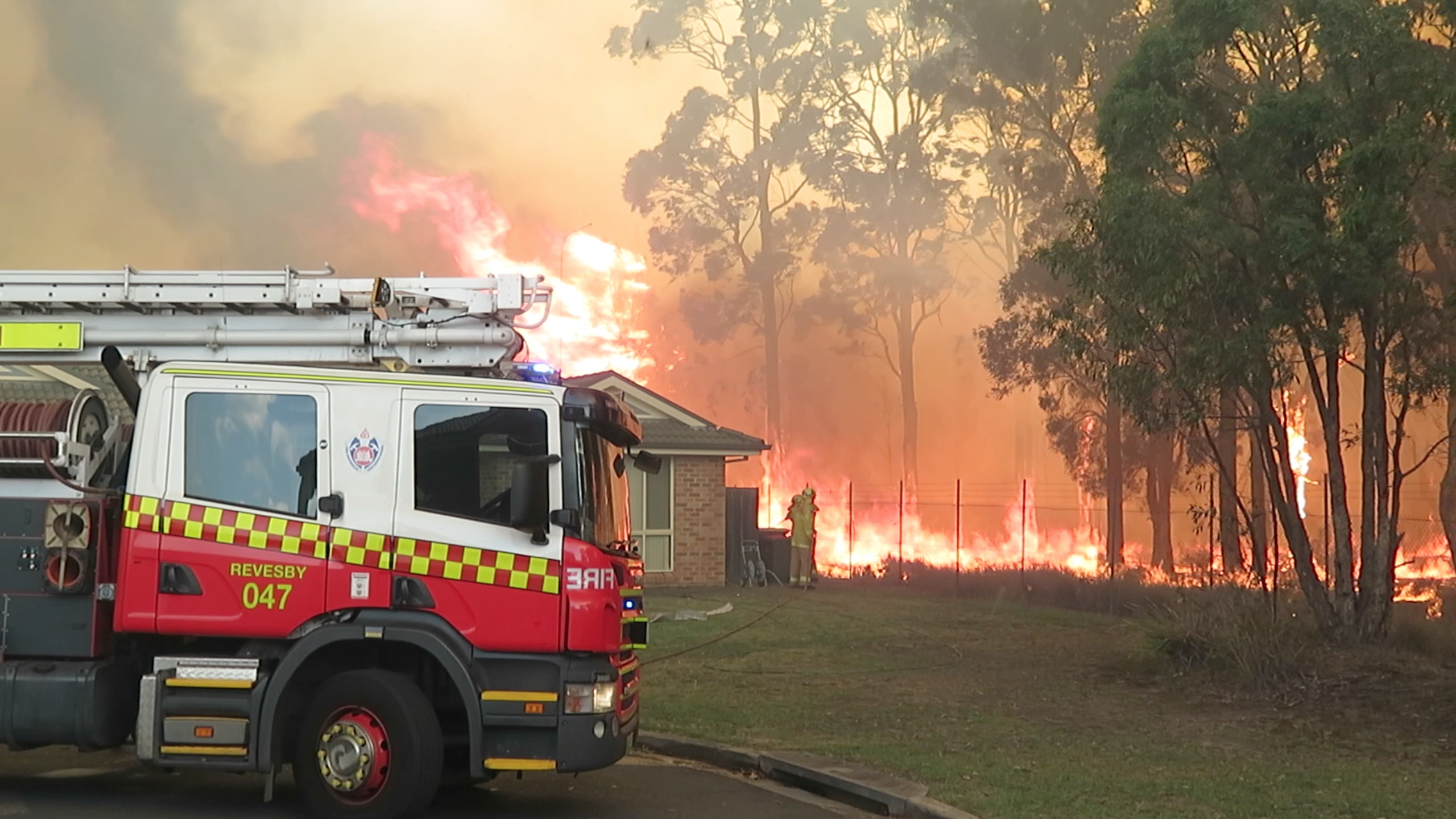
Firefighters protect houses from a bush fire

=== Community Fire Units ===
Community fire units (CFUs) are volunteer teams of local residents trained to safeguard their homes during a bushfire. The units operate until the fire brigades can get there, or to 'mop up' after a fire has passed. Fire units can then be released to attend more urgent incidents. CFU members are not firefighters. The aim of the CFU program is to reduce the impact of bushfires on the community and to protect life and property from bushfires. A typical team is made up of six to 12 members. Recruitment is within the local community. Local fire stations conduct regular training sessions with volunteers. The training focus is on bushfire education, prevention and preparation.

== Operations ==
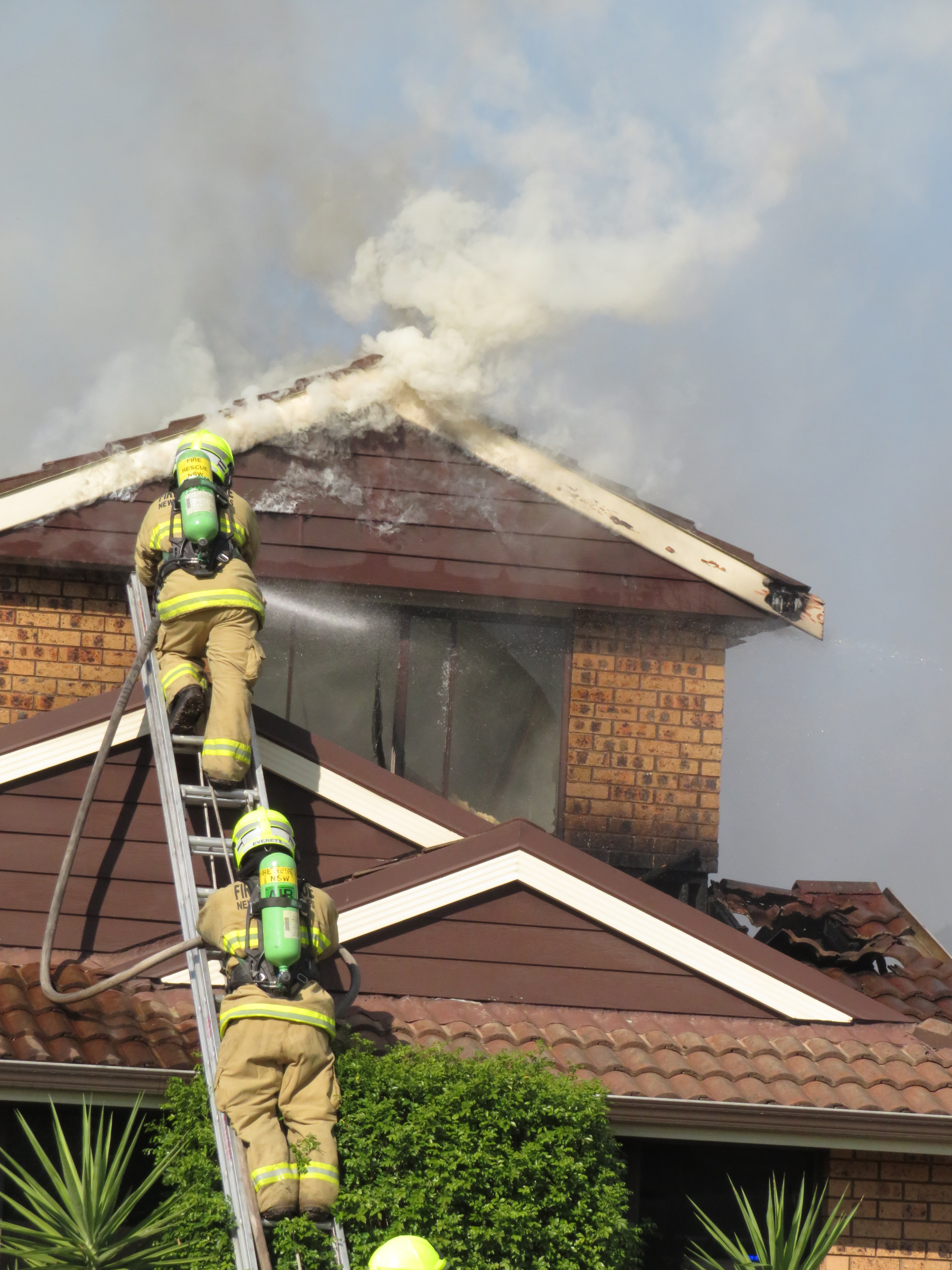
Firefighters scale a ladder to extinguish a house fire

Responding from 335 Fire Stations across the state, Fire and Rescue NSW protect people across New South Wales from fires and emergencies and attend over 124,000 calls a year.

=== Fire ===
The majority of Fire and Rescue NSW's workload comes from fires, with the brigade responding to over 68,000 fire related calls in the 2017/18 period. These included over 6,000 structure fires, ranging from house fires to high rise fires. Fire Rescue NSW's busiest station for fires is Ropes Crossing, who attend over 650 confirmed fires a year. FRNSW maintain a strong percentage of having 78% of structure fires contained to the room of origin, which can be attributed to the tenacity and hard work of firefighters, combined with the strong work of Fire Safety and Community Education. FRNSW attend an average of about 350 'Greater Alarm' fires a year, which are fires that require the attendance of four or more stations. The largest attendance at a structure fire in 2018 was a 9th Alarm Factory Fire in Seven Hills, which required more than 25 stations to get under control.

FRNSW also responded to close to 9,000 bushfires in 2017/18, including a number of major wild fires that destroyed thousands hectares of bushland along with hundreds of houses. FRNSW operate a dedicated Bushfire and Aviation Section, based at Sydney Olympic Park, which is co-located with the NSW Rural Fire Service Headquarters. FRNSW work closely with the NSW Rural Fire Service along with other agencies including the NSW National Parks and Wildlife Service and the Forestry Corporation of NSW. Together, all four agencies come together to protect the state from bush and grass fires across all jurisdictions. In April 2018, over 70 FRNSW stations along with the RFS and NPWS attended a 17th Alarm Bush Fire which threatened hundreds of houses in Wattle Grove, Holsworthy, Menai and Alfords Point. Together, firefighters worked to prevent a single property loss as a result of the fire.

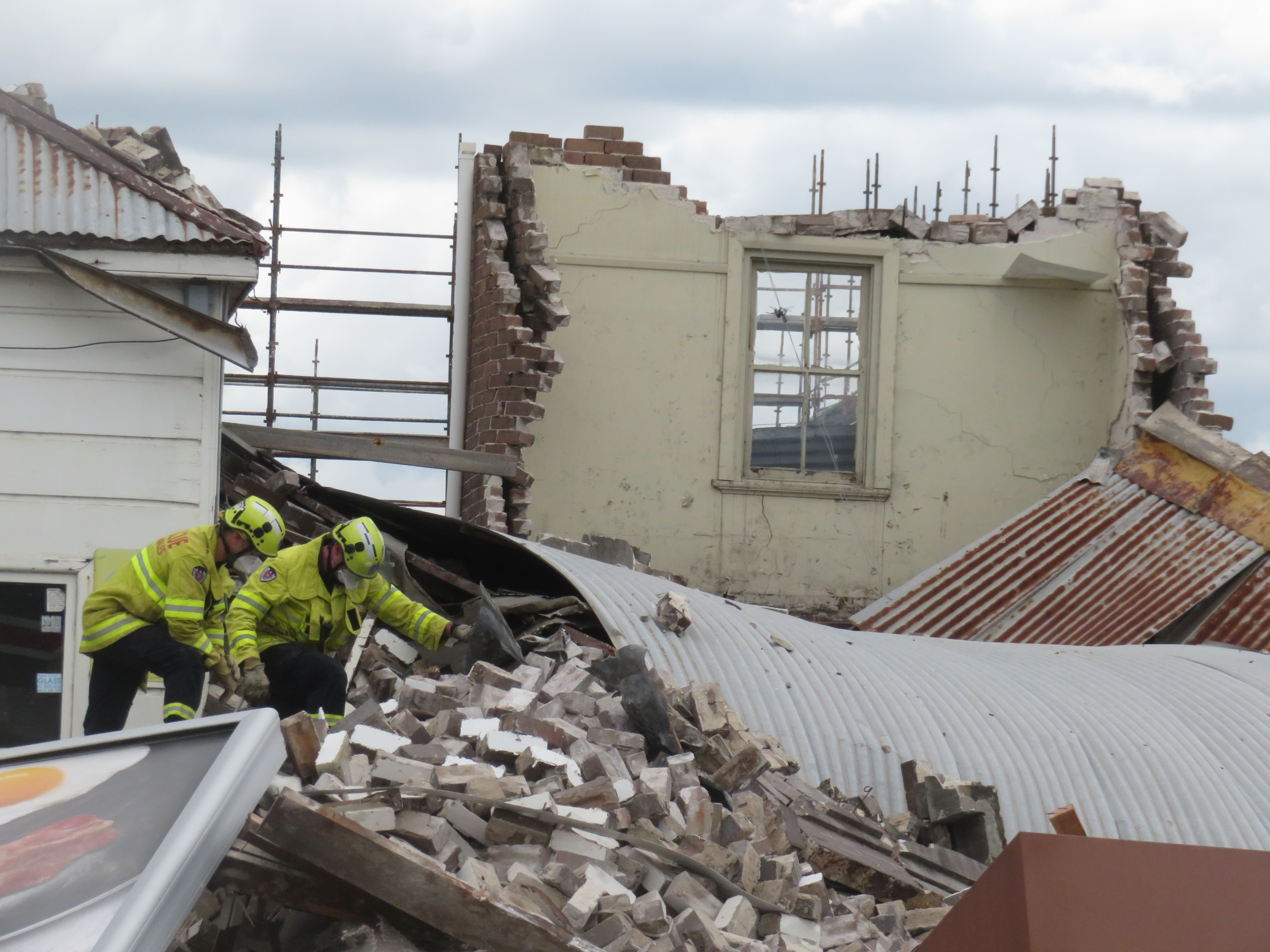
Firefighters search rubble for survivors of a building collapse

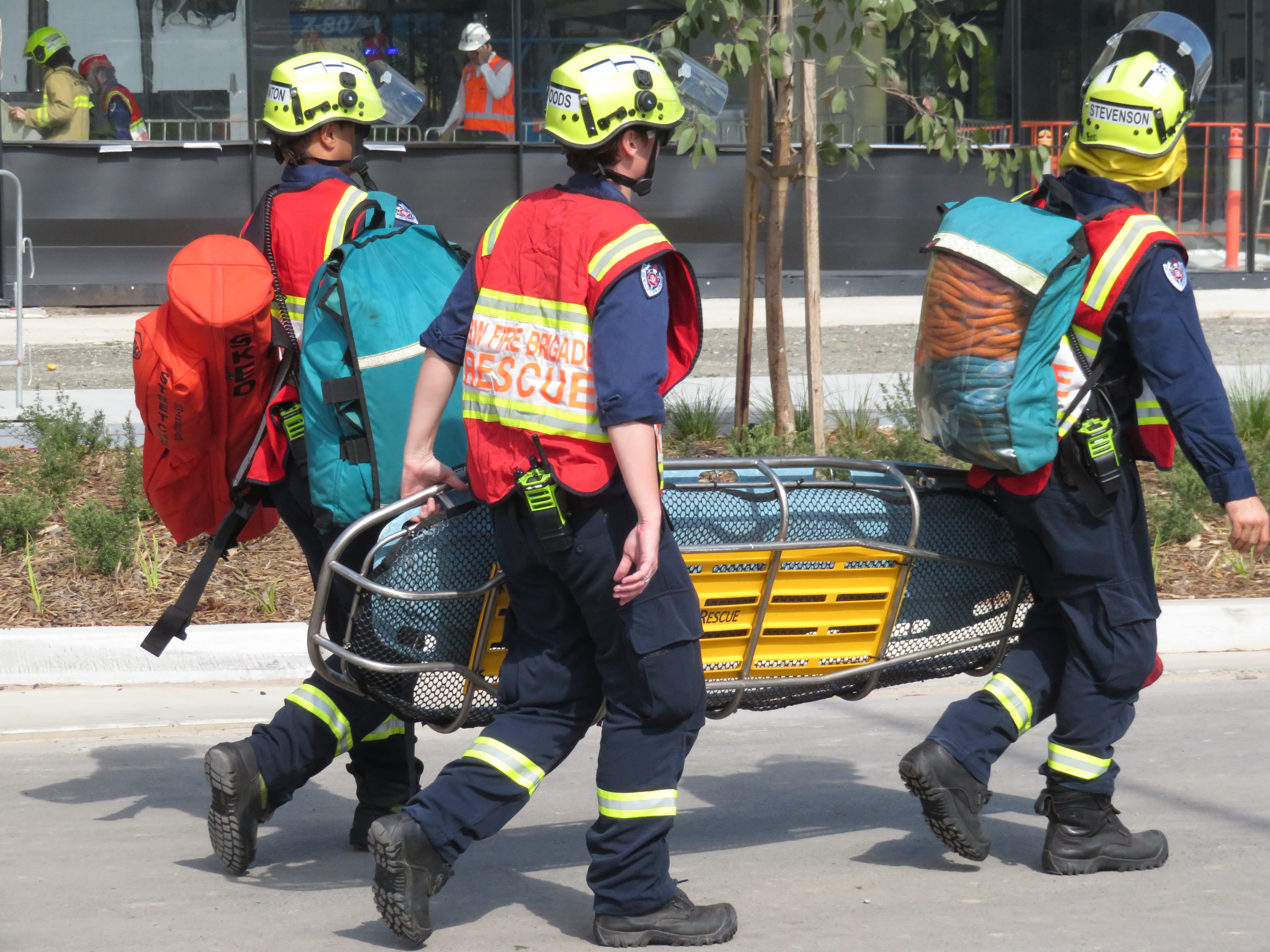
Firefighters with a stokes basket and rope rescue kit

=== Rescue ===
As the primary rescue service in the state, Fire and Rescue NSW responded to over 12,000 rescues in 2017/18. Fire and Rescue NSW are equipped to deal with all varieties of rescue incidents, including Domestic, Industrial, Road Crash, Transport, Confined Space, Vertical, Heavy Vehicle, Alpine, Trench, Bariatric, Swift Water, Large Animal and Collapse rescues. Along with standard ‘Primary’ and ‘Secondary’ rescue units, Fire and Rescue NSW operate seven Heavy Rescues and four Technical Rescues across the metropolitan areas state, which carry an extensive array of heavy and technical rescue equipment.

Fire and Rescue NSW also operate one of Australia's two Urban Search and Rescue Task Forces (NSWTF1 / AUS-2), who are accredited as a Heavy USAR Team by the United Nations INSARG. The Team are based out of Sydney, with a number of operators and vehicles across the state capable of providing both a domestic and international capability. In 2011, Fire and Rescue NSW deployed the Team in a Heavy capacity twice to both the Christchurch Earthquake and the Japan Earthquake & Tsunami.

=== Hazardous Materials ===
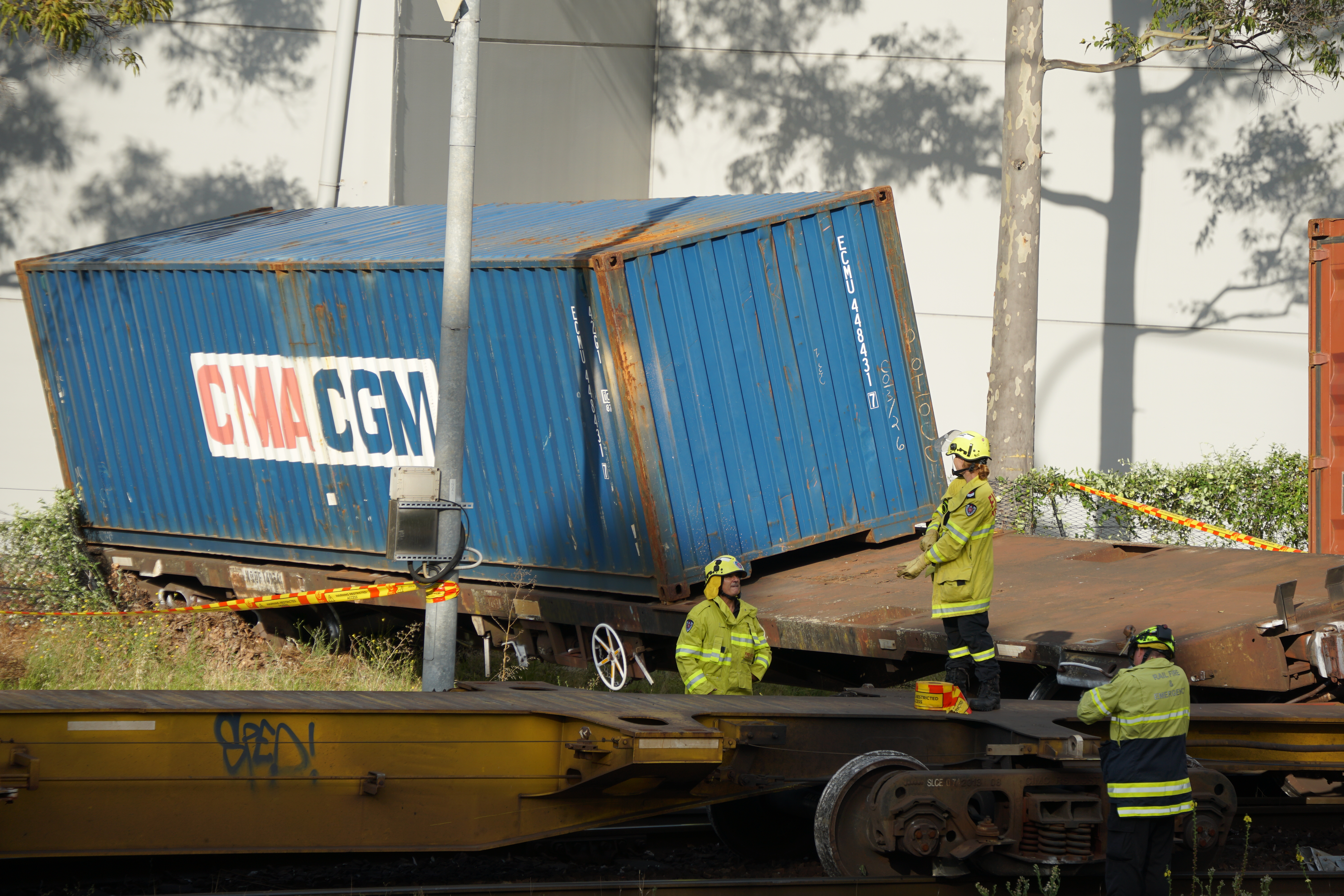
Firefighters search the wreckage of Port Botany Freight Train Derailment

Fire and Rescue NSW are the sole responsible agency for Hazardous Materials incidents in inland New South Wales. They attended over 16,000 hazardous conditions incidents in 2017/18, ranging from gas leaks to chemical spills. Each station is equipped to deal with HazMat incidents to an extent, such as absorbing fuels, basic hydrocarbon booming, atmospheric monitoring and decontamination. Across the state, Fire and Rescue NSW operate 6 Heavy HazMats which are capable of dealing with more serious incidents, which are supported by 26 intermediate HazMat stations regionally.

Additional capability is provided by the HazMat Advisory Response Team (HART), who can deploy on a statewide basis with a range of highly specialised equipment such as Raman and Infrared spectrometers. Fire and Rescue NSW's Scientific Officers provide specialist scientific technical advice to crews statewide and can respond their mobile laboratory when required. HART can deploy the waterways response vessel, Otter II. Other capabilities include mass decontamination units.

=== Emergency Response ===
Fire and Rescue NSW are on hand 24/7 every day of the year available to assist the residents in New South Wales in their times of need. Fire and Rescue NSW work closely with the New South Wales State Emergency Service to respond to incidents during and following storm/weather events, such as chainsawing downed trees, tarping roofs and pumping out flooded areas. This is in addition to Fire and Rescue NSW's flood/swift water rescue role. Another one of Fire and Rescue NSW's unique roles is their snake handling capability, with firefighters across the state trained in the safe capture and removal of snakes from peoples homes. Rescuing children and pets locked in cars forms another important part of Fire and Rescue NSW's role, particularly in hot Australian summers.

In eleven remote and rural locations across the state, Fire and Rescue NSW are involved in the Community First Responder (CFR) program. CFR firefighters respond to medical emergencies with NSW Ambulance, who are often located a distance away from the medical emergency. Firefighters provide initial lifesaving patient care, who are supported by paramedics upon their arrival. Stations across the state are regularly called upon to assist NSW Ambulance in a general capacity, often providing manpower and specialist equipment when needed. These are just some of the diverse range of public calls for assistance that Fire and Rescue NSW attend every year.

Capability	Fire Rescue	RFS	SES	VRA	Police Rescue	Ambulance
Vehicle extrication	Yes	Yes	Yes	Yes	Yes	Yes
Community first responder	Yes	Yes	Yes	Yes	Yes	Lead
Flood/Swift water rescue	Yes	Yes	Lead	Yes	Yes	Yes
Storm and flood damage	Yes	Yes	Lead	Yes	No	No
Missing person search	Yes	Yes	Yes	Yes	Lead	Yes
Alpine rescue	Yes	No	Yes	Yes	Lead	Yes
Rope/Vertical rescue	Yes	No	Yes	Yes	Yes	Yes
Urban search and rescue	Lead	Yes	Yes	Yes	Yes	Yes
Animal rescue	Yes	Yes	Yes	Yes	Yes	Yes
Aircraft operations	No	Yes	Yes	Yes	Yes	Yes
Drone operations	Yes	Yes	Yes	Yes	Yes	Yes
Search and rescue dogs	Yes	No	No	Yes	Yes	No
Mounted search and rescue	No	No	No	Yes	Yes	No
Hazmat	Lead	No	No	No	No	No
Tsunami preparedness	No	No	Lead	No	No	No
Structure/Vehicle fires	Lead	Lead	No	No	No	No
Grass/Bush fires	Yes	Lead	No	No	No	No

== Fire apparatus (Appliances) ==
=== Pumpers ===
Photo	Callsign	Class (Previous Class)	Chassis Make and Model	Body Manufacturer	Commissioned	Number	Pump Capacity
	P, RP	Pumper Class 2 (Isuzu)	Isuzu FTR800	Skilled Equipment Manufacturing	1999–2007	167 Vehicles	3000LPM @1000kPA
	P, RP	Pumper Class 2 (Isuzu) (17 Pumpers, 13 Rescue)	Isuzu FTR900	Skilled Equipment Manufacturing	2009–2013	30 Vehicles	3000LPM @1000kPA
	P, RP	Pumper Class 2 (Mercedes) (33 Pumpers, 19 Rescue)	Mercedes-Benz Atego	Kuipers Engineering	2014–2018	52 Vehicles	3000LPM @1000kPA
	CP, CRP	Pumper Class 2 (Iveco) (16 CAFS Rescue, 23 CAFS)	Iveco EuroCargo	Skilled Equipment Manufacturing	2019–present	39 Vehicles	3000LPM @1000kPA
	P, RP	Pumper Class 3 (Varley Commander) (22 Type 4 and 11 Type 5 Pumpers)	VSV Commander Mk I	Varley Specialised Vehicles	2000–2002	33 Vehicles (27 retired)	3500LPM – 5300LPM @1000kPA
	P, RP	Pumper Class 3 (Varley Commander)	VSV Commander Mk II	Varley Specialised Vehicles	2002–2005	20 Vehicles (14 retired)	3500LPM @1000kPA
	P, RP, CP	Pumper Class 3 (Scania)	Scania P94D	Australian Fire Company	2001–2002	12 Vehicles (includes 1 CAFS prototype - now retired)	3500LPM @1000kPA
	P, RP, HP	Pumper Class 3 (Scania)	Scania P310/P320	Skilled Equipment Manufacturing (One VSV Prototype)	2007–2012	87 Vehicles	3900LPM @1000kPA
	CP, RP, HP, P	Pumper Class 3 (Scania) (10 CAFS, 10 Rescue, 12 Pumpers, 2 Hazmat)	Scania P320	Kuipers Engineering	2016–2019	34 Vehicles	4100LPM @1000kPA
	P, CP	Pumper Class 3 (Scania) (6 CAFS, 5 Pumpers)	Scania P320	Kuipers Engineering	2020–2022	11 Vehicles	4100LPM @1000kPA
	CP, CHP, RP	Pumper Class 3 (Scania) (13 CAFS, 4 CAFS Hazmat, 14 Rescue)	Scania P320	SEM Fire And Rescue (Skilled), Rescue Pumpers built by Bell Fire And Rescue	2023–present	31 Vehicles	4100LPM @1000kPA

=== Rescue Appliances ===
Photo	Callsign	Class	Chassis Make and Model	Body Manufacturer	Commissioned	Number
	HR	Heavy Rescue	Isuzu FVD950	Mills-Tui	2000–2001	6 Vehicles
	HR	Heavy Rescue	Isuzu FVD1000	Mills-Tui	2009–2013	6 Vehicles
	TR	Technical Rescue	Scania P310	Varley Specialised Vehicles	2017–2018	4 Vehicles
	HR	Heavy Rescue	Scania P320	Varley Specialised Vehicles	2022–2023	2 Vehicles
	USAR-4	USAR Recon	Isuzu D-Max	Skilled Equipment Manufacturing	2020	1 Vehicles
	USAR	Urban Search and Rescue	Iveco	Peki Transport Equipment	2019	1 Vehicles

=== Water Tankers ===
Photo	Callsign	Class	Chassis Make and Model	Body Manufacturer	Commissioned	Number	Water Tank Capacity
	T	Tanker Class 1 (Isuzu)	Isuzu FTS700	Australian Fire Company	1996–1997	34 Vehicles	1800L–3000L
	T	Tanker Class 1 (Isuzu)	Isuzu FTS750	Mills-Tui	2004–2006	33 Vehicles	3000L
	T, HT, RT	Tanker Class 1 (Isuzu)	Isuzu FTS800	Mills-Tui	2009–2011	24 Vehicles	2200L–2700L
	T, CT	Tanker Class 1 (Isuzu)	Isuzu FTS800	Kuipers Engineering (CAFS variants by Varley)	2014–2018	24 Vehicles	3000L
	T, CT, HT, RT	Tanker Class 1 (Mercedes) (3 tankers, 5 CAFS, 11 Hazmat, 18 Rescue)	Mercedes Atego 1626	Varley Specialised Vehicles	2014–2016, 2023–present	37 Vehicles	2700L–3200L
	BT	Black Panther	Freightliner	Alexander Perrie & Co	2007	1 Former Public Order Riot Squad	12000L
	T, CT	Tanker Class 1 (Isuzu) (10 Tankers, 18 CAFS)	Isuzu FTS 139-260	Kuipers Engineering (CAFS variants by Alexander Perrie & Co)	2021–present	28 Vehicles (4 standard tankers in use as technical support vehicles to assisst in water rescues)	3500L (Standard), 4000L (CAFS)
	BT	Bulk Tanker Class 1 (Isuzu)	Isuzu FVS1400	Varley Specialised Vehicles	2014–2016	6 Vehicles	9000L
	LT	Light Tanker Class 1 (Mitsubishi)	Mitsubishi Canter	Phillips Engineering	2007–2008	2 Vehicles	1500L
	LT	Light Tanker Class 1 (Isuzu)	Isuzu NPS64	Westrucks	2016	4 Vehicles	1500L
	BWC	Bulk Water Trailers		Hockney Engineering	1987–1995	2 Vehicles	28000L–33000L

=== Aerial Appliances ===
Photo	Callsign	Class	Chassis/Aerial Make and Model	Body Manufacturer	Commissioned	Number	Aerial Reach
	AP	Aerial Pumper	Scania P94G Telesqurt	Mills-Tui	2000–2001 (all retired)	9 Vehicles	15 Metres
	AP	Aerial Pumper	Scania P340/P360 Telesqurt	Alexander Perrie & Co	2010–2012	4 Vehicles	15 Metres
	CAP	CAFS Aerial Pumper	Scania P410 EGI Klubb 240 ATPI	Varley Specialised Vehicles	2020–2025	11 CAPs	24 Metres
	TL	Turntable Ladder	Iveco DL23 TTL	Iveco Magirus/Varley Specialised Vehicles	2002	2 Vehicles (Both non operational, 1 preserved)	30 Metres
	LP	Ladder Platform	Mercedes K2437 Bronto Skylift F37 HDT 2000	Alexander Perrie & Co	1996–2000	6 Vehicles (All non Operational and Retired)	37 Metres
	LP	Ladder Platform	Scania Bronto F37-HDT	Alexander Perrie & Co	2003–2008	3 Vehicles (1 retired)	37 Metres
	LP	Ladder Platform	Scania Bronto F27-RLH	Alexander Perrie & Co	2005–2007	4 Vehicles (3 Retired)	27 Metres
	LP	Ladder Platform	Scania Bronto Skylift F44-RLX	Alexander Perrie & Co	2010	1 Vehicle	44 Metres
	LP	Ladder Platform	Scania Bronto Skylift FL-45-XR	Alexander Perrie & Co	2020–2024	6 Vehicles	45 Metres
	TL	Turntable Ladder	MAN Rosenbauer L33-A XS	Rosenbauer/Metz	2023	1 vehicle	33 Metres
	TL	Turntable Ladder	MAN Rosenbauer L32-A XS	Rosenbauer/Metz	2024–2026	3 vehicles	32 Metres

=== HazMat Appliances ===
Photo	Callsign	Class	Chassis Make and Model	Body Manufacturer	Commissioned	Number
	LH	HazMat Van	Mercedes Sprinter	ETT Engineering	2000–2006	2 Vehicles
	LH	HazMat Van	Mercedes Sprinter	Neil Ellis Fabrications	2017	14 Vehicles
	HH	Heavy HazMat	Isuzu FVD950	Varley Specialised Vehicles	2007	6 Vehicles
	HH	Heavy HazMat/ HART Special Operations	Isuzu FVD1000	Streamline Truck and Body Builders	2009	3 Vehicles
	CO	CO2 Tender	Isuzu FFR550/600	Mills-Tui	1995–2012	2 Vehicles
	S	Scientific Van	Mercedes Sprinter	Neil Ellis Fabrications	2012	1 Vehicle

=== Support Appliances ===
Photo	Callsign	Class	Chassis Make and Model	Body Manufacturer	Commissioned	Number
	MCC-A MCC-B	Mobile Command Centre	Scania G400	Varley Specialised Vehicles	2015	2 Vehicles
	DC-XX Zone Initials	Zone Commander	Isuzu D-Max	Skilled Equipment Manufacturing	2015	21 Vehicles
	CS-1 CS-B	Communications Support	Iveco Daily	Skilled Equipment Manufacturing	2023	2 Vehicles
	K-9	FIRU Canine	Isuzu D-Max	Skilled Equipment Manufacturing	2021	1 Vehicle
	RPAS	Remote Piloted Aviation System	Isuzu D-Max	Skilled Equipment Manufacturing	2021	1 Vehicle
	HL	Hooklift Transporter	Scania P280	Scania/Hyvalift	2013	1 Vehicle
	HL	Hooklift Transporter	Isuzu FVY1400	Isuzu/Hyvalift	2016	1 Vehicle
	LS	Logistic Support Vehicle	Iveco/Isuzu/Mitsubishi	Various	2010–2017	7 Vehicles
	FT	Foam Transport Vehicle	Isuzu NPR	Isuzu	2017	1 Vehicle
	RV	Rehab Van	Mercedes Sprinter	Neil Ellis Fabrications	2013–2017	3 Vehicles
	RH	Rehab Van	Mercedes Sprinter	Neil Ellis Fabrications	2019–present	5 Vehicles
	LSV	Lube Service Vehicle (LSV)	Izuzu/UD	Various	2015	5 Vehicles
	TAF20	Turbine Aided Firefighting	EMI Controls ETL 160 EC	Magirus	2015	1 Vehicle
	ELS5	Education and Training	Toyota Hilux		2022	
		General Purpose Vehicle	Toyota RAV4			

=== Alpine Appliances ===
Photo	Callsign	Class	Chassis Make and Model	Body Manufacturer	Commissioned	Number
	ATP	Hägglund All Terrain Pumper	Hägglunds Bv 206 AMT	Hägglund	1983–1988	2 Vehicles
	ATV	Skidoo	Yamaha VK450EE	Yamaha	2004–2013	8 Vehicles
	ATV	Quad Bike	Polaris Big Boss 800	Polaris	2010–2014	4 Vehicles

== Community engagement ==
Fire and Rescue NSW engages in a variety of community training and education activities, and has partnered with GIO to promote fire risk awareness and safety. Events such as Fire Prevention Week are organised by FRNSW during the year.

In 2011 FRNSW and GIO created an advertising campaign to highlight the serious ramifications of fire in the domestic environment and to encourage people to use the free home fire safety audit tool. The advertising campaign was accompanied by a harrowing video telling the story of Linda, who not only suffered a brain injury in a domestic fire, causing her to have to learn to walk and talk again, but she lost her sister to the blaze. Additionally FRNSW worked with GIO to create a tranche of informational fire safety videos.

== See also ==
- Firefighting
- New South Wales Rural Fire Service
- NSW National Parks & Wildlife Service
- Country Fire Service
- Country Fire Authority
- National Council for Fire & Emergency Services
