= New South Wales Rural Fire Service =

Volunteer firefighting agency

- Seal

- Flag

Operational area
- Country: Australia
- State and territory: New South Wales; Jervis Bay Territory
- Address: 4 Murray Rose Avenue, Sydney Olympic Park

Agency overview
- Established: 1896; 130 years ago
- Annual calls: 24,973 (FY 2022–23)
- Annual budget: $786,526,000 (FY 2022–23)
- Staffing: 1,240 (paid staff); 70,829 (voluntary members)
- Commissioner: Trent Curtin
- Motto: Prepare. Act. Survive

Facilities and equipment
- Stations: 1,994
- Engines: 74 Pumpers
- Rescues: 12
- Ambulances: CFR 7
- Tenders: 43 Bulk Water
- Wildland: 3,946 (4x4 and 4x2)
- Airplanes: Three owned and various on contract.
- Helicopters: Three owned and various on contract.
- Fireboats: 32

Website
- www.rfs.nsw.gov.au

The New South Wales Rural Fire Service (NSW RFS) is a volunteer-based firefighting agency that is organised as a statutory body under the Government of New South Wales.

The NSW RFS is responsible for fire protection covering approximately 95% of the land area of New South Wales and the Jervis Bay Territory, while urban areas and over 90% of the civilian population are the responsibility of Fire and Rescue NSW. The NSW RFS is the primary combat agency for bushfires in the state. In addition, they respond to structural fires, vehicle fires, motor vehicle accidents and a wide range of other emergencies, as well as providing preventative advice to local communities.

The NSW RFS is organised into 2,000 brigades (local units). As of 30 June 2019, the service employed over 1,600 paid staff who fulfil operational, management, administrative and mitigation roles. The agency attends to approximately 30,000 incidents per annum.

The agency is led by its Commissioner, Trent Curtin , who reports to the Minister for Emergency Services and Resilience.

The NSW Rural Fire Service Association (RFSA) is the official representative association for both volunteer and salaried members of the NSW RFS. In addition to facilitating advocacy at all levels of the RFS, the RFSA also provides support for brigades, members and their families.

The NSW RFS was at the forefront of one of Australia's worst bushfire outbreaks, known as the Black Summer, which took place over the bushfire season between June 2019 and March 2020.

== History ==
Prior to 1997, bushfire fighting services in New South Wales were essentially a patchwork of more than 200 separate fire fighting agencies working under a loose umbrella with no single chain of command. The core of the service, then as now, was the volunteer brigades that were organised along council district lines under the command of a locally appointed Fire Control Officer. Fire fighting efforts were funded by the Bush Fire Fighting Fund, established in 1949 and financed by insurance companies, local council and the State Government. A variety of State-run committees and councils oversaw bush fire operations with members drawn from various Government fire fighting agencies and council and volunteer representatives. These groups developed legislation and techniques but in the main responsibility for bushfire management was vested in individual local councils in dedicated bush fire areas as determined under the 1909 Fire Brigades Act. This Act proclaimed the areas serviced by the Board of Fire Commissioners (now Fire and Rescue NSW) and covered the urban areas of Sydney and Newcastle together with most regional and country towns of any significance.

In January 1994, extreme weather conditions resulted in over 800 bush fires breaking out along the coast of NSW. More than 800,000 hectares (2,000,000 acres) of land and 205 homes were burnt. 120 people were injured and four people were killed, including a volunteer firefighter from the Wingello Bush Fire Brigade (seven were also injured). The financial cost of the disaster was estimated at $165 million. The lengthy Coronial Inquiry that followed recommended the State Government introduce a single entity responsible for the management of bush fires in NSW. The 1997 Rural Fires Act was proclaimed on 1 September, with Phil Koperberg announced as Commissioner. As Director-General of the Department of Bush Fire Services, Koperberg had been in command of the fire agencies battling the 1994 fires and was instrumental in developing the legislation that led to the Rural Fires Act.

=== Volunteer brigades, 1896–1936 ===
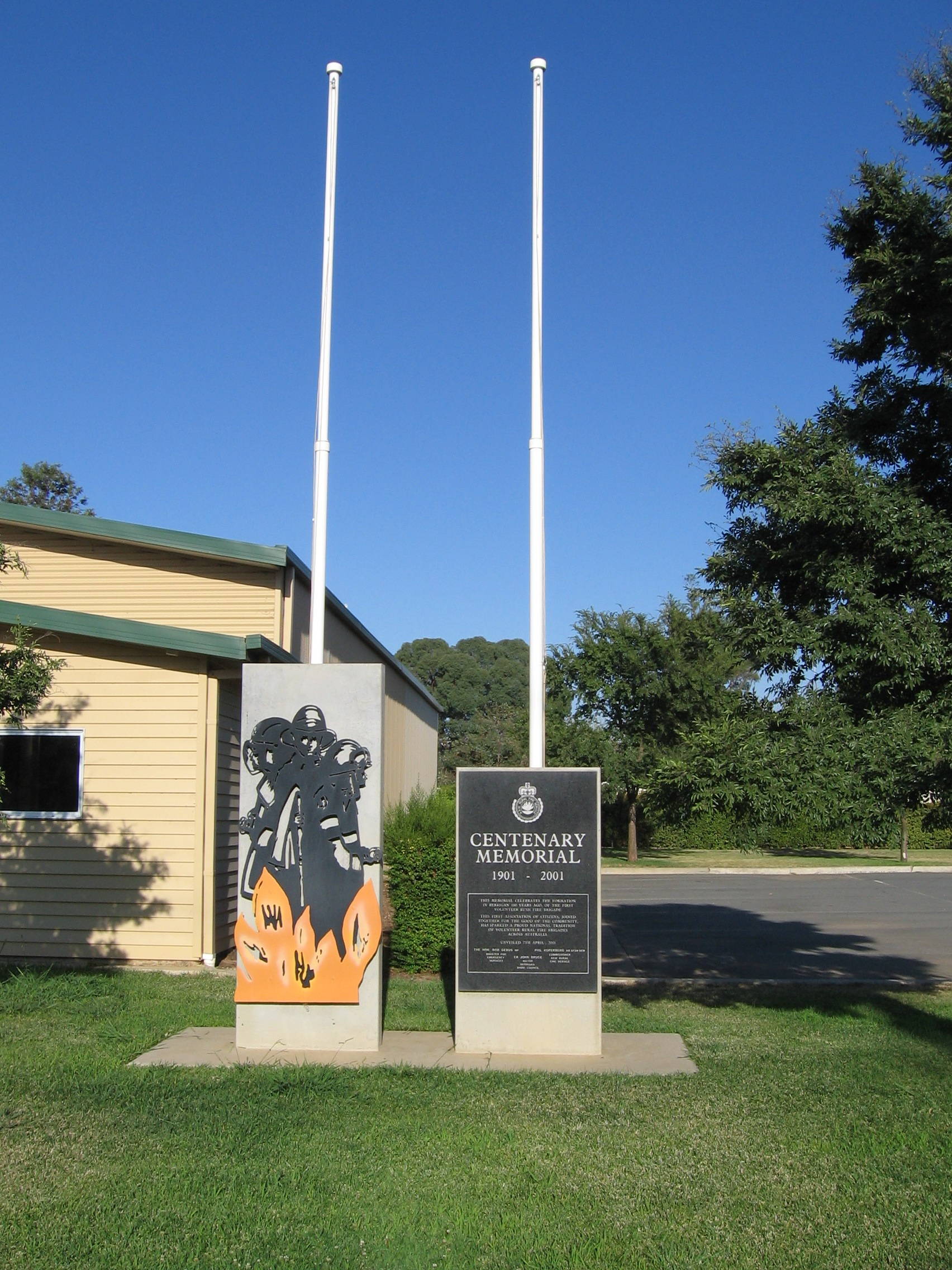
RFS memorial in Berrigan commemorating the establishment of the first bush fire brigade in New South Wales.

Organised control of bush fires began with the establishment of the first volunteer bush fire brigades at Berrigan in 1896. This brigade had been established in response to a series of large fires in northern Victoria and south western New South Wales in the 1890s. These culminated in the Red Tuesday fire of 1 February 1898 in Gippsland that claimed 12 lives and destroyed 2000 buildings.

In 1916 the Local Government Act provided for the prevention and mitigation of bush fires by authorising local councils to establish, manage and maintain these brigades. The establishment of the Bush Fires Act in 1930 granted local councils the authority to appoint bush fire officers with powers comparable to those held by a Chief Officer of the NSW Fire Brigades. These Fire Control Officers were responsible for bush fire management within their appointed local council districts.

=== Bush Fire Advisory Committee, 1939–1948 ===
In September 1939 a conference of fire-fighting authorities was convened to discuss the prevention of bush fires during the summer months. The Bush Fire Advisory Committee was established to prevent and mitigate bush fires. This committee had no statutory powers but publicised the need for the public to observe fire safety precautions and highlighted the role of Bush Fire Brigades. It was also largely responsible for preparing legislation that led to the Bush Fires Act of 1949.

=== Bush Fire Committee, 1949–1970 ===
The Bush Fires Act, 1949 came into effect on 9 December 1949. This legislation consolidated and modernised the law relating to the prevention, control and suppression of bush fires, and gave councils and other authorities wider powers to protect the areas under their control. The system of bush fire brigades was composed of volunteers and directed by locally appointed officers; eventually, shire and district councils or Ministers could appoint group captains to direct brigades formed by two adjoining councils.

The Act also gave the Governor of NSW the authority to proclaim bush fire districts where none had previously been proclaimed. Essential to the legislation was the establishment of the Bush Fire Fighting Fund. This Fund was financed by insurance companies contributing half the funds with the remainder supplied equally by State and local government. The Act also enabled for the co-ordination of the activities of the Board of Fire Commissioners, the Forestry Commission (now State Forests) and the Bush Fire Brigades. The Minister for Local Government was empowered to appoint a person to take charge of all bush fire operations during a state of emergency.

The Bush Fire Committee replaced the Bush Fire Advisory Committee and had 20 members representing NSW Government departments, local government, the insurance industry, the farming community, the Board of Fire Commissioners, and the Commonwealth Meteorological Bureau. A Standing Committee composed of a chairman and five others met at least once a month. Based in Sydney, the Bush Fire Committee advised the Chief Secretary and Minister for Local Government on all matters relating to bush fires, and generally co-ordinated the work of volunteer fire fighting groups and was responsible for community education relating to bush fires.

The most significant bushfire in New South Wales during this period was the Southern Highlands (1965) bushfire.

=== Bush Fire Council/Bush Fire Service, 1970–1997 ===
In 1970 the Bush Fire Committee was replaced by the Bush Fire Council, with members drawn from the various fire fighting authorities from around the state. A special Co-ordinating Committee was established to oversee the co-ordination of fire-fighting and related resources prior to and during the bush fire season, and particularly during bush fire emergencies. A Chief Co-ordinator of Bush Fire Fighting was also appointed.

In January 1975, the Bush Fires Branch of the NSW Chief Secretary's department integrated with the State Emergency Service and renamed the Bush Fire Service.

The Department of Bush Fire Services was established in 1990. Brandon Leyba was appointed Director-General of the Department on 11 May. The Department's main role was in co-ordinating the fire fighting activities of other government agencies such as the National Parks and Wildlife Service, State Forests of New South Wales, Sydney Water and the New South Wales Fire Brigades in emergency circumstances. It was also responsible for the management and control of the NSW Bush Fire Fighting Fund and the co-ordination of the State's 2,500 Bush Fire Brigades, however the brigades still remained under the direct control of local council.

Major bushfires during this period were in Far West NSW at Moolah-Corinya, Cobar, Balranald, and across other parts of NSW (in 1974–1975), Sydney (1979), Waterfall (1980), Grays Point (1983), Western NSW grasslands (1984), Cobar and across other parts of NSW (in 1984–1985), and across Australia's eastern seaboard (1994).

=== NSW Rural Fire Service, 1997–present ===
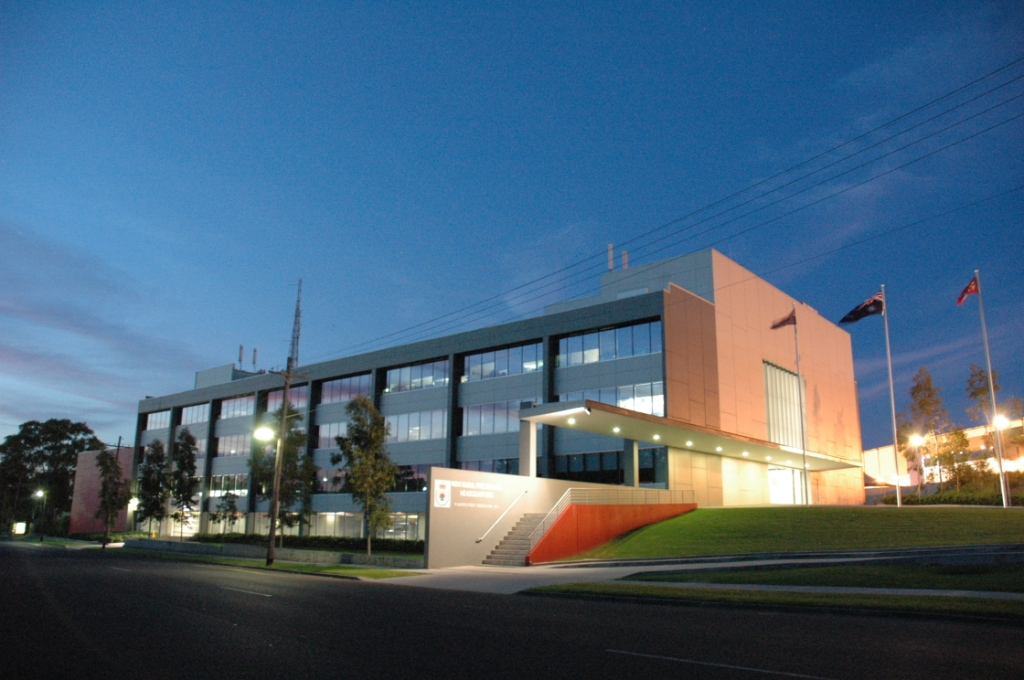
The former Rural Fire Service Headquarters situated on Carter Street, Lidcombe.

The NSW Rural Fire Service was established by the Rural Fires Act 1997 which was assented to on 10 July 1997 and came into force on 1 September 1997. The Rural Fires Act repealed the Bush Fires Act, 1949 thereby dissolving the Bush Fire Council and its Committees. Members of these bodies ceased to hold office but were entitled to hold office on a replacing body.

The Rural Fire Service Advisory Council of New South Wales was established. The Council was to consist of nine representatives with a direct or indirect association with bush fire prevention and control; the Commissioner in charge of bush fire fighting services was ex-officio to be the Chairperson of the Council. The task of the Council was to advise and report to the Minister and Commissioner on any matter relating to the administration of rural fire services, and to advise the Commissioner on public education programs relating to rural fire matters, training of rural fire fighters, and on the issue of Service Standards.

A statutory body – the Bush Fire Co-ordinating Committee – also was established. This was to consist of 12 members including the Commissioner who was to act as Chairperson. The Committee was to be responsible for the administration of rural fires management as well as advising the Commissioner on bush fire prevention.

The Committee was to constitute a Bush Fire Management Committee for "the whole of the area of any local authority for which a rural fire district is constituted". Each Management Committee was to prepare and present to the Council a plan of operations and bush fire risk management plan for its area within three months of establishment. The former was to be reviewed every two years; the latter every five years.

Section 102 of the new act established the New South Wales Rural Fire Fighting Fund to replace the New South Wales Bush Fire Fighting Fund. Quarterly contributions from insurance companies, local councils and the Treasury were to continue in the same proportions as under previous legislation – 14% from the State Treasury, 73.7% from the insurance industry and 12.3% from local Councils.

Major bushfires during this period were at Lithgow (1997), Black Christmas (2001–02), Central Coast (2006), Junee (2006), Pulletop (2006), Australian season (2006–07), Warrumbungles (2013), New South Wales (2013), Carwoola (2017), Tathra (2018), and Black Summer (2019–20).

== Structure ==
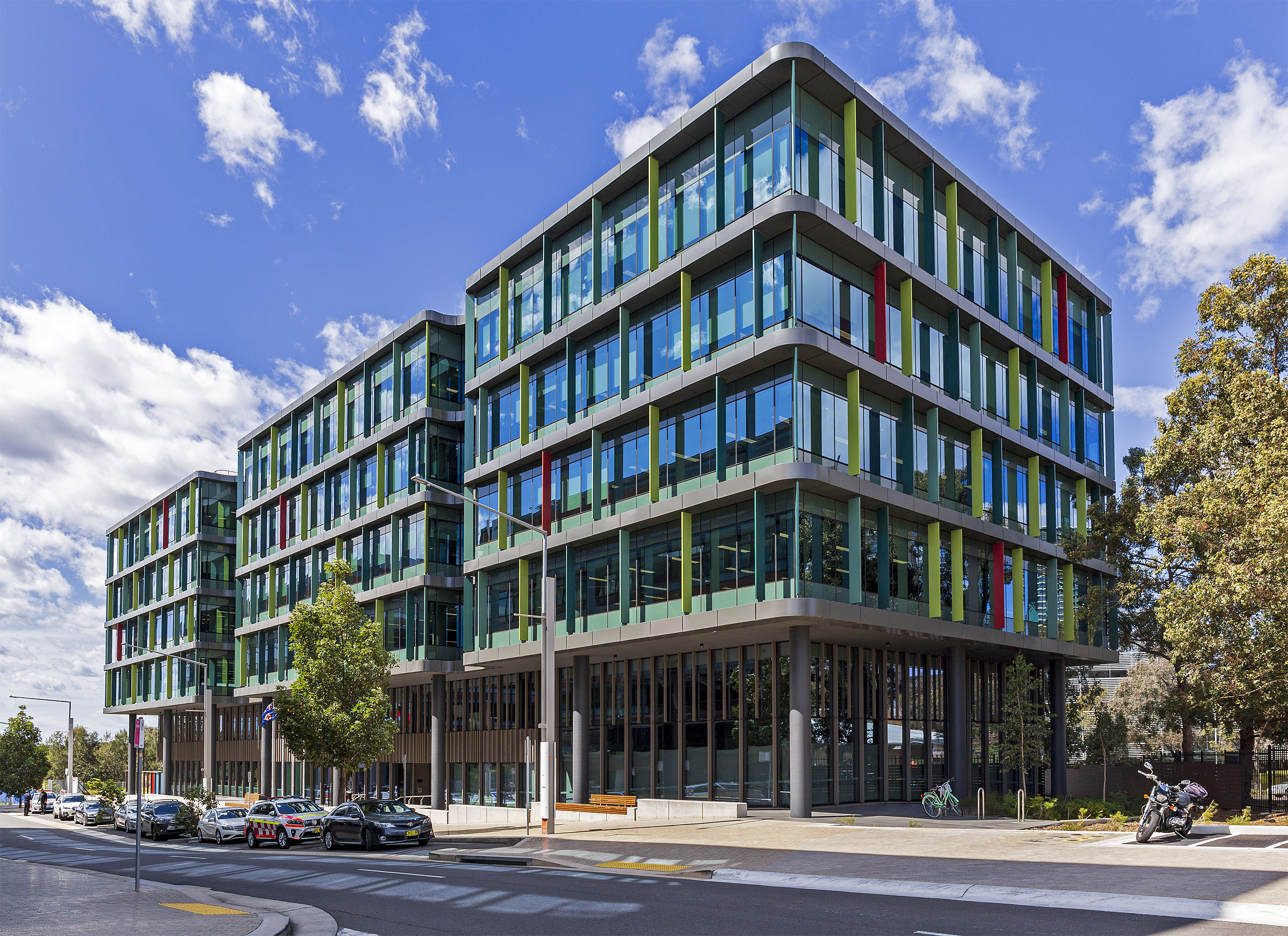
Current NSW Rural Fire Service Headquarters situated on Murray Rose Avenue, Sydney Olympic Park

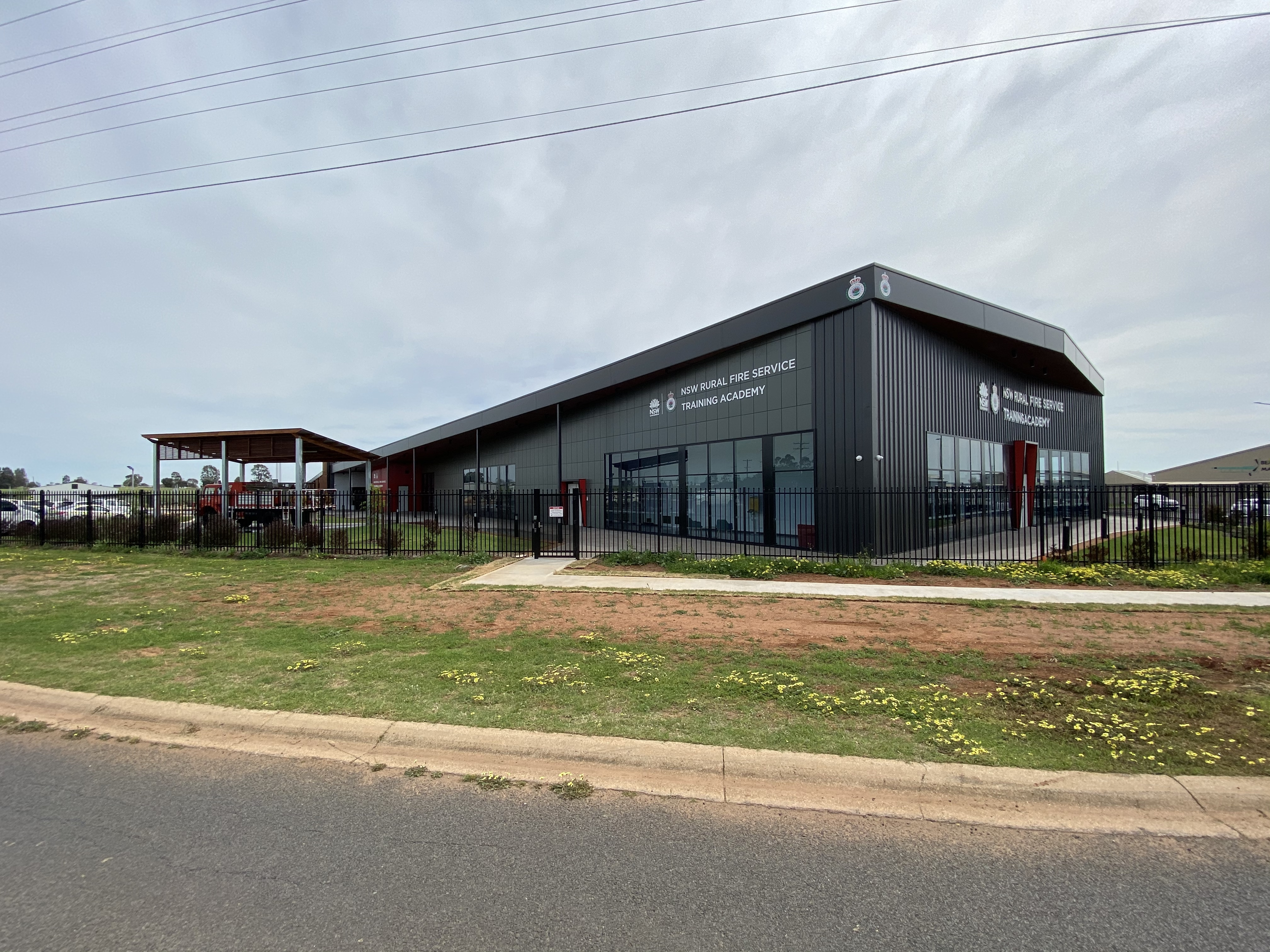
NSW Rural Fire Service Training Academy in Dubbo

NSW RFS Headquarters is located at 4 Murray Rose Avenue, Sydney Olympic Park. It relocated to this location in November 2018 and was previously situated at Rosehill until October 2004. Separate directorates within NSW RFS Headquarters are responsible for Infrastructure Services, Membership and Strategic Services, Field Operations, and Finance and Executive Services.

The RFS Headquarters also contains the Operational Communications Centre (OCC), which is the only section of the RFS which is permanently staffed 24 hours a day. The OCC performs centralised dispatch and radio communications for every district in the service, as well as liaising with other agencies on behalf of the RFS. District communications brigades can 'take back' the communications of their district from the OCC during major incidents and for training purposes, in which case the communications brigade is responsible for all radio communications and Computer-aided dispatch usage.

Regional offices mirror the responsibilities of state headquarters at more centralised locations across the State. The original eight regions were consolidated into four by 2000, with the model changed to be seven Areas in 2019. Each area contains multiple districts.

These areas are as follows:

- North Eastern located at Coffs Harbour
- North Western located at Tamworth
- South Eastern at Batemans Bay relocating to Moruya in 2027/2028
- South Western at Albury
- Western located at Cowra
- Hunter located at Lake Macquarie
- Greater Sydney located at Glendenning

Formerly run by council-appointed officers, district Fire Control Centres became State controlled under the Rural Fires Act. District offices manage the day-to-day affairs of local brigades and maintain responsibility for local fire prevention and strategies. With the amalgamation of neighbouring districts over recent years, there are 47 NSW Rural Fire Service Districts.

Volunteer brigades are responsible for hands-on bush firefighting duties. Since the establishment of the Rural Fire Service, the role of brigades has gradually expanded to include disaster recovery, fire protection at motor vehicle accidents, search and rescue operations and increased levels of structural firefighting. There are more than 2,000 firefighting brigades and more than 50 catering and communications brigades providing support.

== Senior officers ==
=== Commissioner ===
The most senior member of the organisation is the Commissioner.

The first NSW RFS Commissioner was Phil Koperberg, who was previously the Director-General of the NSW Department of Bushfire Services since its creation in 1990. In 2007 he stepped down as Commissioner after announcing his candidature for the 2007 state election in which he was elected as the Member for Blue Mountains. In September 2007 Shane Fitzsimmons was officially appointed NSW RFS Commissioner. In May 2020, Shane Fitzsimmons commenced in the role of Commissioner of Resilience NSW. Rob Rogers was appointed to the role of Acting Commissioner on 1 May 2020, before being permanently appointed on 16 July.

Ordinal	Name	Title	Term start	Term end	Time in office	Notes
1	Phil Koperberg AO, AFSM, BEM	Commissioner	1 September 1997	12 January 2007	9 years, 133 days	
2	Shane Fitzsimmons AO, AFSM	Commissioner	18 September 2007	30 April 2020	12 years, 225 days	
3	Rob Rogers AFSM	Commissioner	16 July 2020	4 July 2025	4 years, 353 days	
4	Trent Curtin	Commissioner	14 July 2025	incumbent	1 year, 125 days	

=== Deputy Commissioner ===
In addition to the Commissioner, there are four Deputy Commissioners/Executive Directors who make up the senior executive of the Service.

They have responsibility for Field Operations, Strategic Capability, Operational Coordination and People & Culture

Name	Title	Term start	Term end	Time in office	Notes
Rob Rogers AFSM	Deputy Commissioner	18 September 2007	16 July 2020	12 years, 346 days	
Bruce McDonald AFSM	Deputy Commissioner	25 November 2020	May 2021		
Peter McKechnie AFSM	Deputy Commissioner	15 March 2021	Mid 2026		
Kyle Stewart APM	Deputy Commissioner	2021	Mid 2026		
Ben Millington	Deputy Commissioner	2025	Incumbent		
Kelly Quandt AFSM	Deputy Commissioner	2025	Incumbent		
Viki Campbell	Deputy Commissioner	2026	Incumbent		

=== Senior Assistant Commissioner ===
The operational rank of Senior Assistant Commissioner was removed as of the 14th of June 2022.

Previously, the head of one of the functional area aligned Directorates within Headquarters was given the corporatised designation Executive Director.

Two of the former Executive Directors were uniformed personnel with a rank of Senior Assistant Commissioner. The Executive Director, Operational Services held the rank of Deputy Commissioner and the Executive Director, Infrastructure Services held the rank of Senior Assistant Commissioner. Non-operational Executive Directors did not currently operational ranks.

Name	Title	Term start	Term end	Time in office	Notes
Anthony Gates	Senior Assistant Commissioner	1997	1998		
Bruce McDonald AFSM	Senior Assistant Commissioner	2015	2020		

=== Assistant Commissioners ===
Currently the Commissioner has determined that certain occupiers of the role of Director have been appointed to the rank of Assistant Commissioner. Previously, subject to the various executive structures in place, the rank of Assistant Commissioner was held by operational Executive Directors / Directors.

Assistant Commissioners	Term start	Term end
Ross Smith	1997	2002
Mark Crosweller AFSM	1997	2009
Anthony Howe AFSM	1999	2006
Shane Fitzsimmons AO, AFSM	1999	2007
Rob Rogers AFSM	2002	2011
Keith Harrap AFSM	2004	2012
Dominic Lane AFSM	2008	2013
Bruce McDonald AFSM	2013	2015
Jason Heffernan	2015	2020
Stuart Midgley AFSM	2014	2025
Steve Yorke AFSM	2014	2021
Rebel Talbert	2015	2022
Kelly Quandt (nee Browne) AFSM	2018	2021
Peter McKechnie AFSM	2019	2025
Ben Millington	2021	2024
Paul Seager	2021	2025
Mathew Smith	2021	2026
Jayson McKellar AFSM	2022	"Incumbent"
Viki Campbell	2024	2026
Heath Stimson	2025	"Incumbent"
Nicholas Medianik	2025	"Incumbent"
Leigh Pilkington	2025	"Incumbent"

== Ranks and Sections ==
=== Operational ===
==== Joining ====
Members of the public who wish to join the NSW RFS will complete an expression of interest on the RFS website.

==== Support Roles ====
Not all roles require being a fire fighter or having any qualifications. Support roles include but not excluded to:

- Aviation – Aerial firefighting and related activities. Air base support and related activities. See more in the Aviation section.
- Bush Firefighter Support – Supporting in a non-firefighting role under supervision.
- Catering – Preparing food for RFS activities.
- Chaplaincy – Providing spiritual support and other religious services.
- Communication – Working within a Fire Communications Centre or Fire Control Centre (FCC). Note that only a Fire Control Centre is an "FCC", and is also an RFS zone headquarters.
- Community Engagement – Providing members of the public with information, skills and resources on RFS related activities including bush fires and other emergency incidents.
- Trainer/assessor – Assisting RFS members with completing the required competencies to gain qualifications.

Operational Rank	Membership Type	Insignia
Commissioner	NSW Government Senior Executive Service Officer	
Deputy Commissioner	NSW Government Senior Executive Service Officer	
Senior Assistant Commissioner		
Assistant Commissioner	NSW Government Senior Executive Service Officer	
Chief Superintendent	NSW Government Public Service Officer	
Superintendent	NSW Government Public Service Officer	
Inspector	NSW Government Public Service Officer	
Group Captain/Officer L3	Volunteer/NSW Government Public Service Officer	
Deputy Group Captain/Officer L2	Volunteer/NSW Government Public Service Officer	
Officer L1	NSW Government Public Service Officer	
Captain	Volunteer	
Senior Deputy Captain	Volunteer	
Deputy Captain	Volunteer	
Mitigation Crew Leader	NSW Government Public Service Officer	
Firefighter	Volunteer	
Member/Mitigation Crew Member	Volunteer/NSW Government Public Service Officer	

== Equipment ==
The RFS operates a broad range of firefighting equipment including:

=== Appliances ===
Firefighting appliances used within the RFS are identified with a red and white livery, with either red & white or red & yellow reflective chevrons. Appliances are also equipped with red and blue emergency lights and sirens.

The most common of appliances are tankers, of which the most common of tankers are Category 1 Tankers, which is mainly used in a combination of rural and urban/interface roles ('interface' meaning where built-up areas meet bushland). The next most common fire appliances are Category 7 tankers which are used to support heavier appliances in fire fighting operations as well as being a primary appliance themselves. Category 9 appliances are most often used as rapid intervention vehicles (thus the name 'Striker') to attack small and spot fires quickly before they are able to spread.

Category 2, 3 and 4 tankers are less common, due to the flexibility of Category 1 tankers. Category 10 and 11 urban pumpers can be found in many brigades with dedicated urban responsibilities. Appliances are categorised as follows:

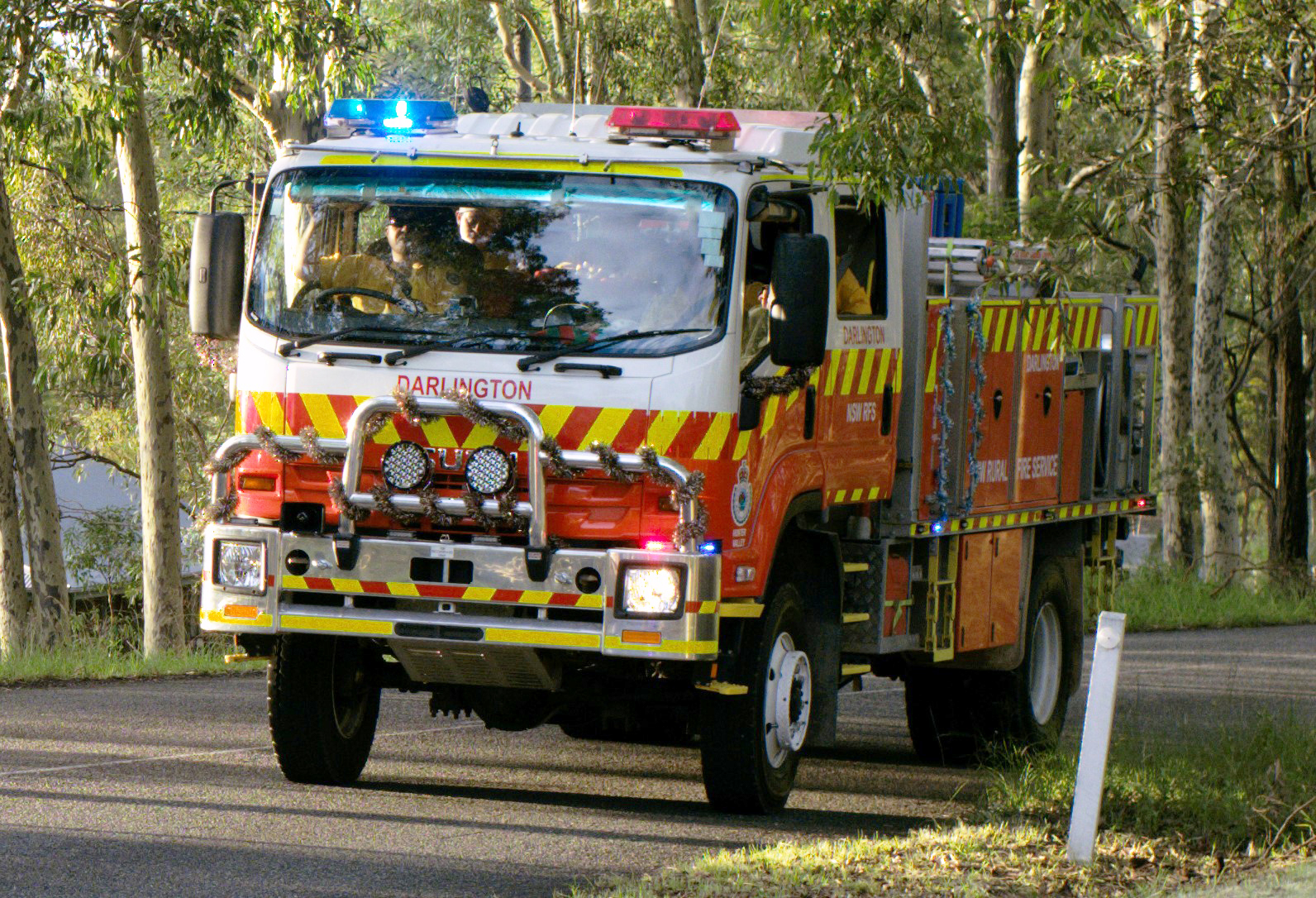
Category 1 Tanker

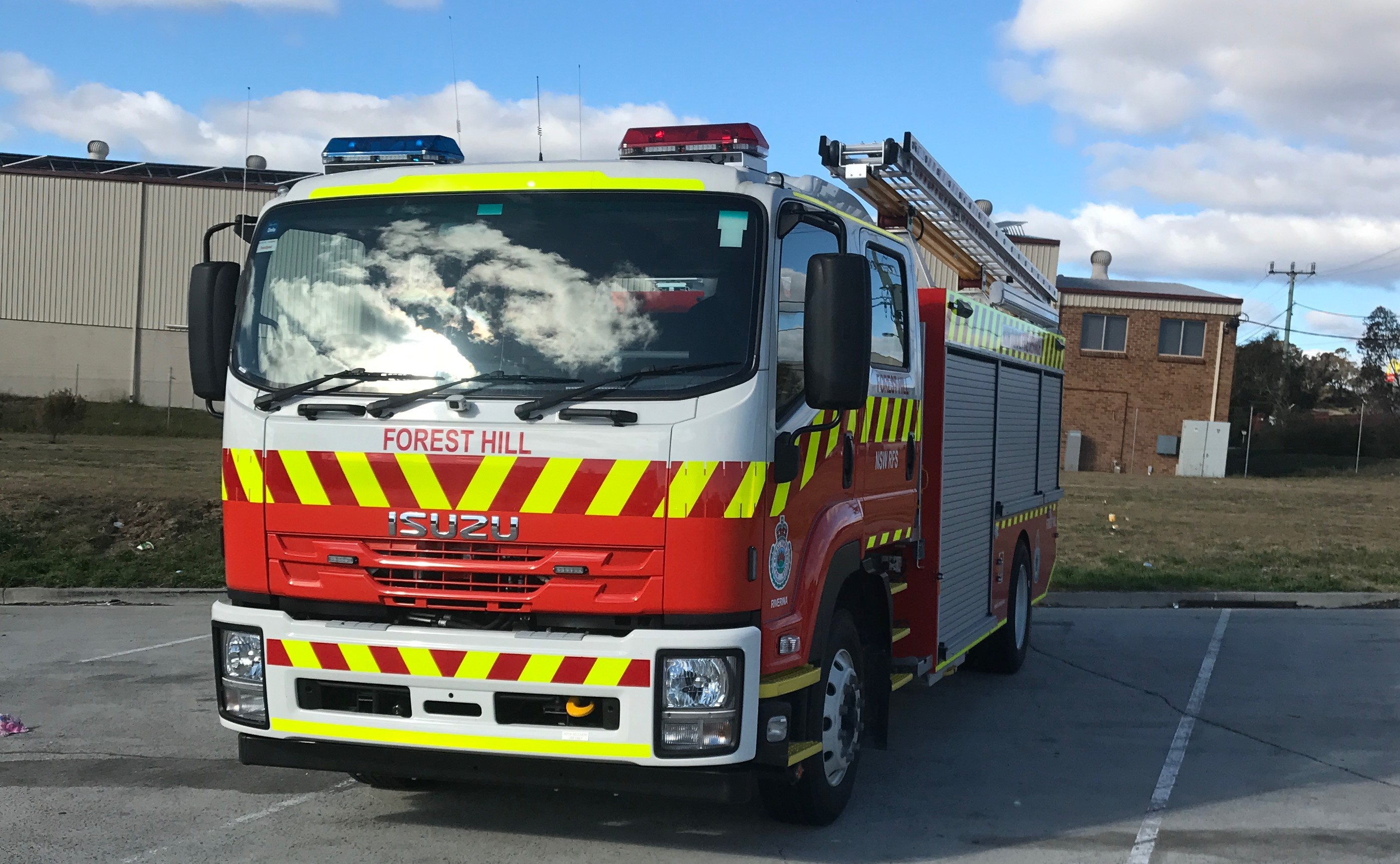
Category 10 Pumper

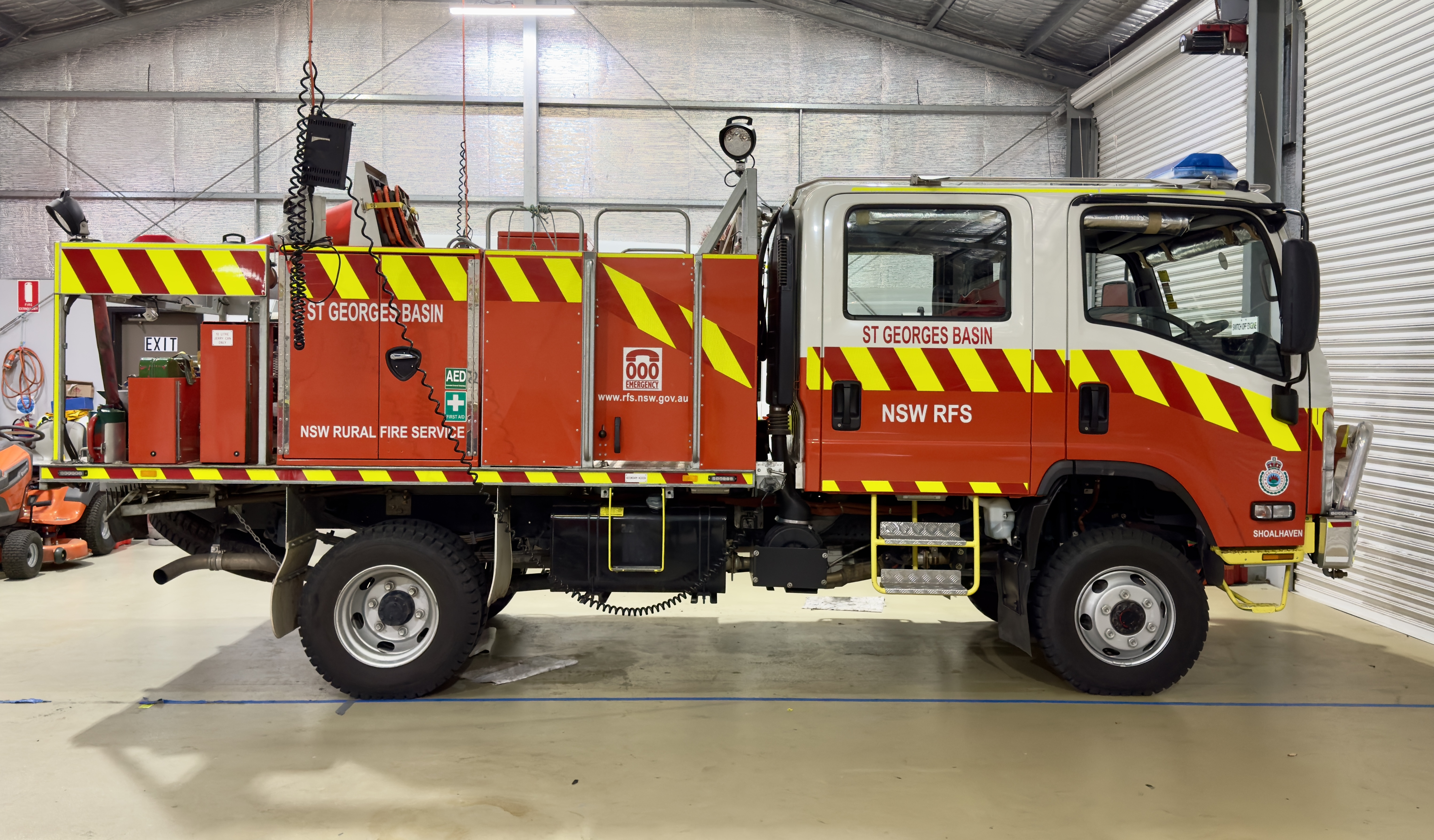
Category 7 Tanker

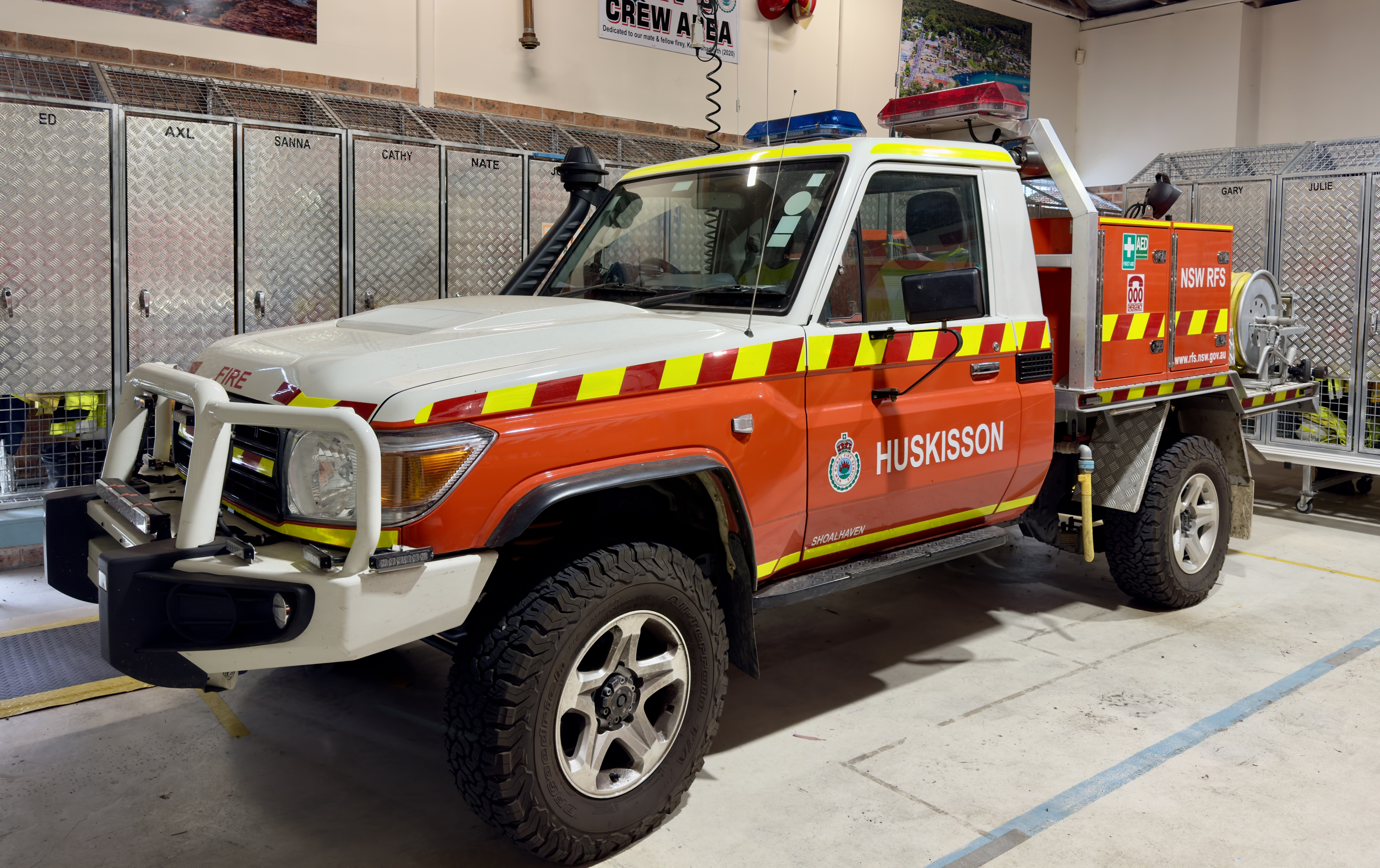
Toyota LandCruiser 70 Category 9 Striker

Category		Description			Capacity
Category		Sub-category	Cab size	Drive wheels	Capacity
1	Heavy Tanker	Village, Grasslands, Multi-Purpose	Single, Crew	4x4	3,000–4,000 litres (660–880 imp gal)
3	Heavy Tanker	Village	Single, Crew	4x2	3,000–4,000 litres (660–880 imp gal)
5	Heavy Tanker	Multi-Purpose	Single	4x4	9000 litres (1980 imp gal)
6	Heavy Tanker	Heavy Bush Tanker	Single	6x4, 6x6	9000 litres (1980 imp gal)
2	Medium Tanker	Multi-Purpose	Crew	4x4	1,600–3,000 litres (350–660 imp gal)
2	Medium Tanker	Grasslands	Single	4x4, 6x6	1,600–3,000 litres (350–660 imp gal)
4	Medium Tanker	Multipurpose	Single, Crew	4x2	1,600–3,000 litres (350–660 imp gal)
7	Light Tanker	Light tanker	Crew	4x4	800–1,600 litres (180–350 imp gal)
7	Light Tanker	Light tanker	Single	4x4, 6x6	800–1,600 litres (180–350 imp gal)
8	Light Tanker	Light Tanker	Single, Crew	4x2	800–1,600 litres (180–350 imp gal)
9	Striker	Striker	Single, Crew	4x4	Less than 800 litres (180 imp gal)
10	Pumper	Village, Medium Pumper	Crew	4x2	More than 1,600 litres (350 imp gal)
11	Pumper	Village, Medium Pumper	Crew	4x4	More than 1,600 litres (350 imp gal)
13	Bulk Water Carrier	Bulk Water Carrier	Single, Crew	4x2, 6x4, 8x4	Approximately 11,000 litres (about 2500 imp gal)
13	Bulk Water Carrier	Bulk Water Trailer	Single, Crew	4x2, 6x4, 8x4	Approximately 11,000 litres (about 2500 imp gal)
15	Fire Boat	Fire Boat			None
16	Operational Command Vehicle	Light vehicles, 4WD's, buses			None
17	Logistics/Support/Mitigation/Remote Area Firefighting	Logistics	Crew	4x2 4x4	None
14	Tanker Trailer	Tanker trailer, small	N/A	N/A	Less than 800 litres (180 imp gal)
14	Tanker Trailer	Tanker trailer, large	N/A	N/A	More than 800 litres (180 imp gal)
14	Tanker Trailer	Pump trailer	N/A	N/A	N/A
12	Personnel Carrier/ Deputy Group/ Group Officer Vehicle	4WD's	Crew	4x4	None
12	Personnel Carrier/ Deputy Group/ Group Officer Vehicle	Bus	Various	Various	None
18	Catering Vehicle/Trailer	Truck	Various	Various	Various
18	Catering Vehicle/Trailer	Trailer	Various	Various	N/A
19	Communication Vehicles	Truck	Various	Various	Various
19	Communication Vehicles	Trailer	Various	Various	N/A
20	Other Vehicles	Various	Various	Various	Various
21	Rescue Vehicles	Light Trucks	Crew, Single	4x4, 4x2	

=== Support vehicles ===
The NSW RFS uses various support vehicles. These are categorised as follows:

- Personnel Carriers. Generally a 4WD in the style of the Toyota Landcruiser or Land Rover Defender. In recent times this has been expanded to include the Toyota Hilux, Nissan Navara, Volkswagen Amarok, Mitsubishi Triton and Ford Ranger.
- Operational Command Vehicles. These mobile communications centres can range in size from small 4WD-type vehicles to bus-type vehicles.
- Bulk Water Tankers to resupply appliances engaged in fire fighting activities.
- Catering Units. Catering units vary in size from small trailers, to large, fully equipped mobile kitchen trucks. Catering Units are usually operated by specialist Catering Brigades, however, zones or brigades may operate their own catering units.
- Lighting Towers. Towed behind a personnel carrier, or other service vehicle. Used to light areas for night time operations such as Motor Vehicle Accidents.
- Boats. Either moored in the water or towed behind a personnel carrier, or other service vehicle. Used in firefighting operations on the water

=== Aviation ===
The NSW Rural Fire Service operates an Aviation Section and owns the largest Firefighting Aircraft fleet in Australia. The NSW RFS owns a Boeing 737 Air Tanker, two Citation jets, six Bell 412s, two Blackhawks and a Chinook. These aircraft have equipment, cameras and Aviation Rescue Crews allowing them to do firebombing operations, remote area firefighter insertion, search and rescue, transport, intelligence gathering, shark spotting, and other specialised taskings. This allows the NSW RFS aviation sector to be used for the most wide-range, specialist emergency aviation operations in Australia. It also contracts a number of aircraft for firefighting water-bombing, reconnaissance, intelligence gathering and transportation. The NSW RFS aircraft continue to be upgraded with additional camera technology and night vision capability.

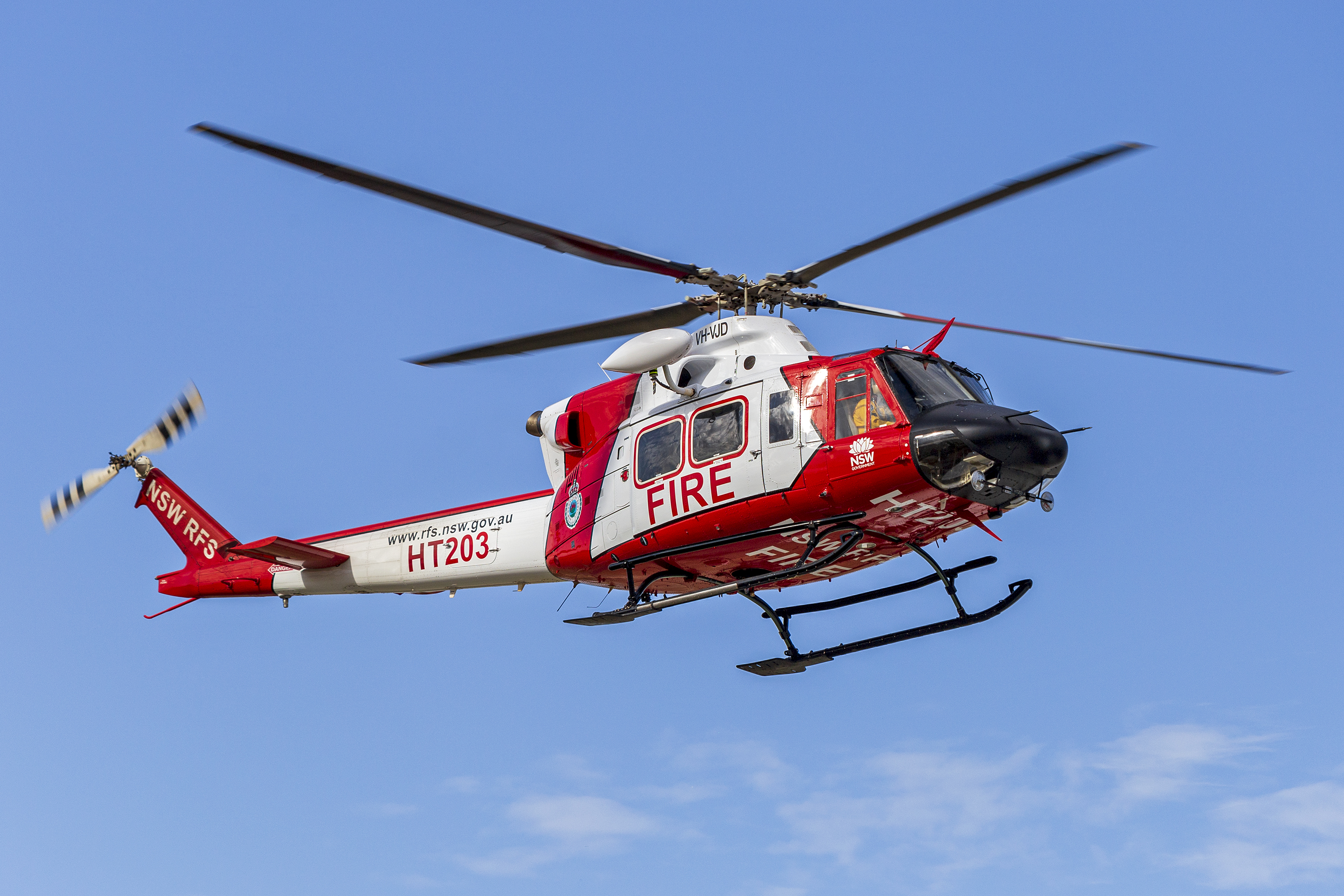
Bell 412 (VH-VJD)

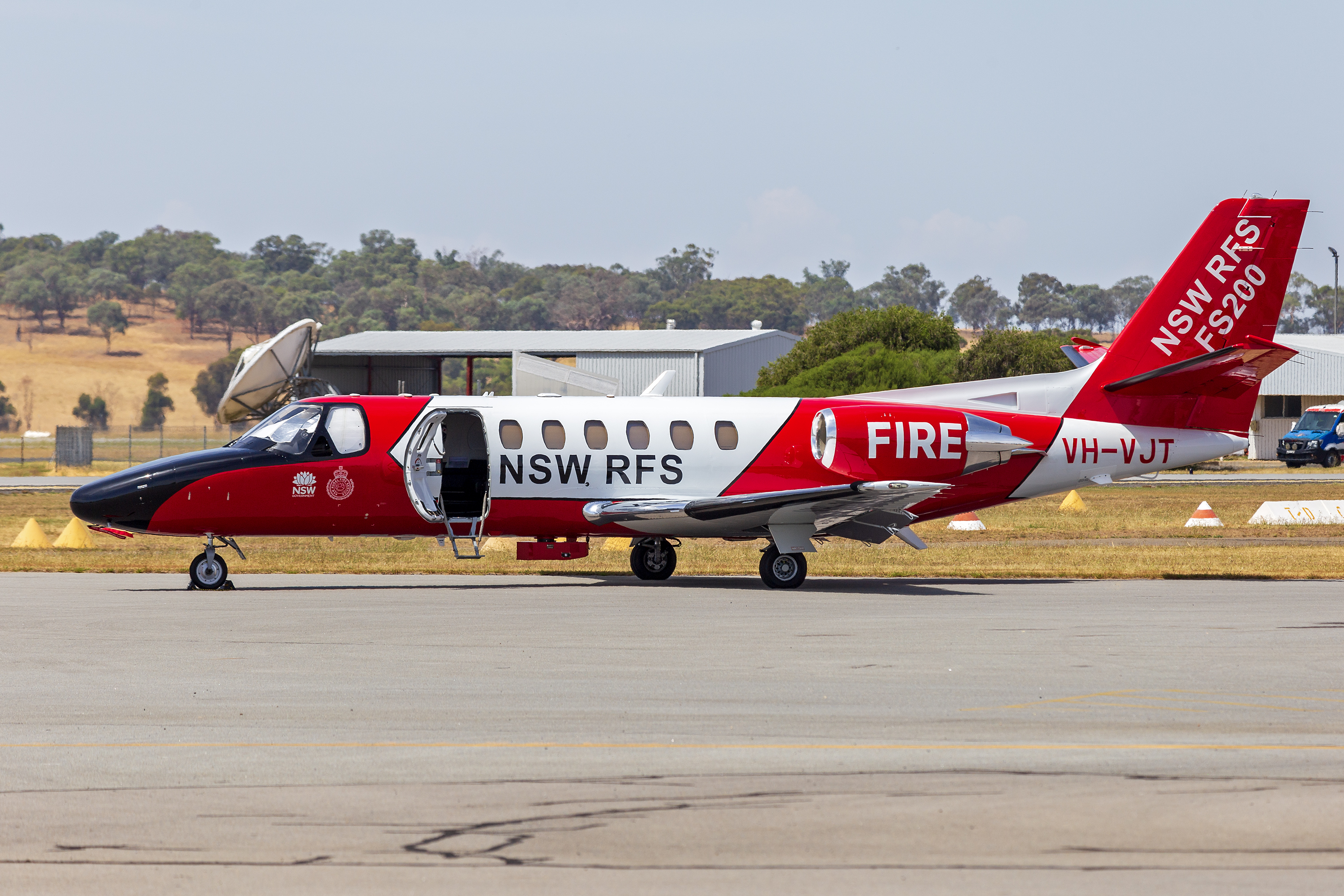
Cessna 560 Citation V (VH-VJT) Fire Scan 200

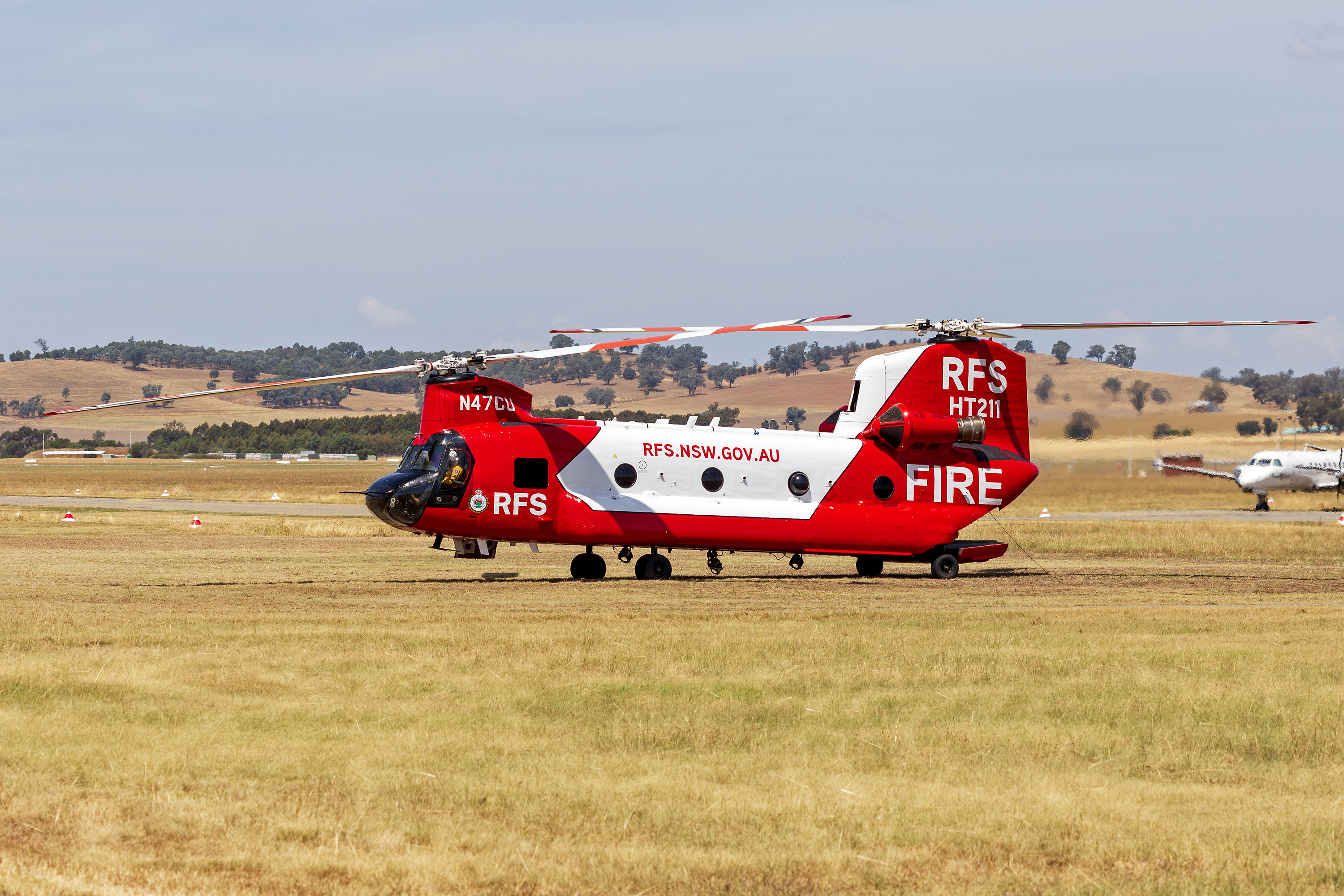
Boeing CH-47D Chinook (N47CU) Helitak 211

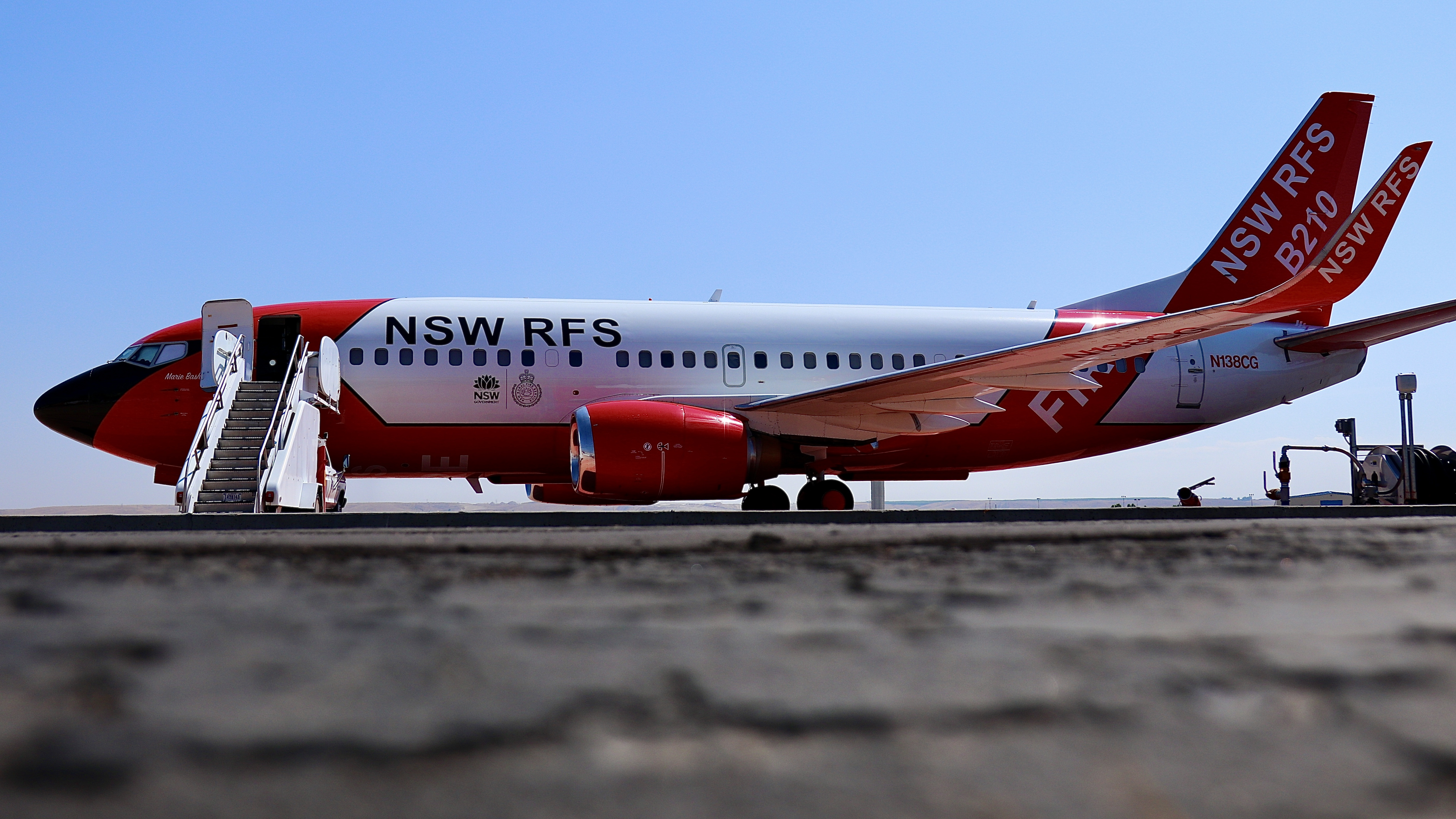
Boeing 737-300 (Large Air Tanker) (N138CG)

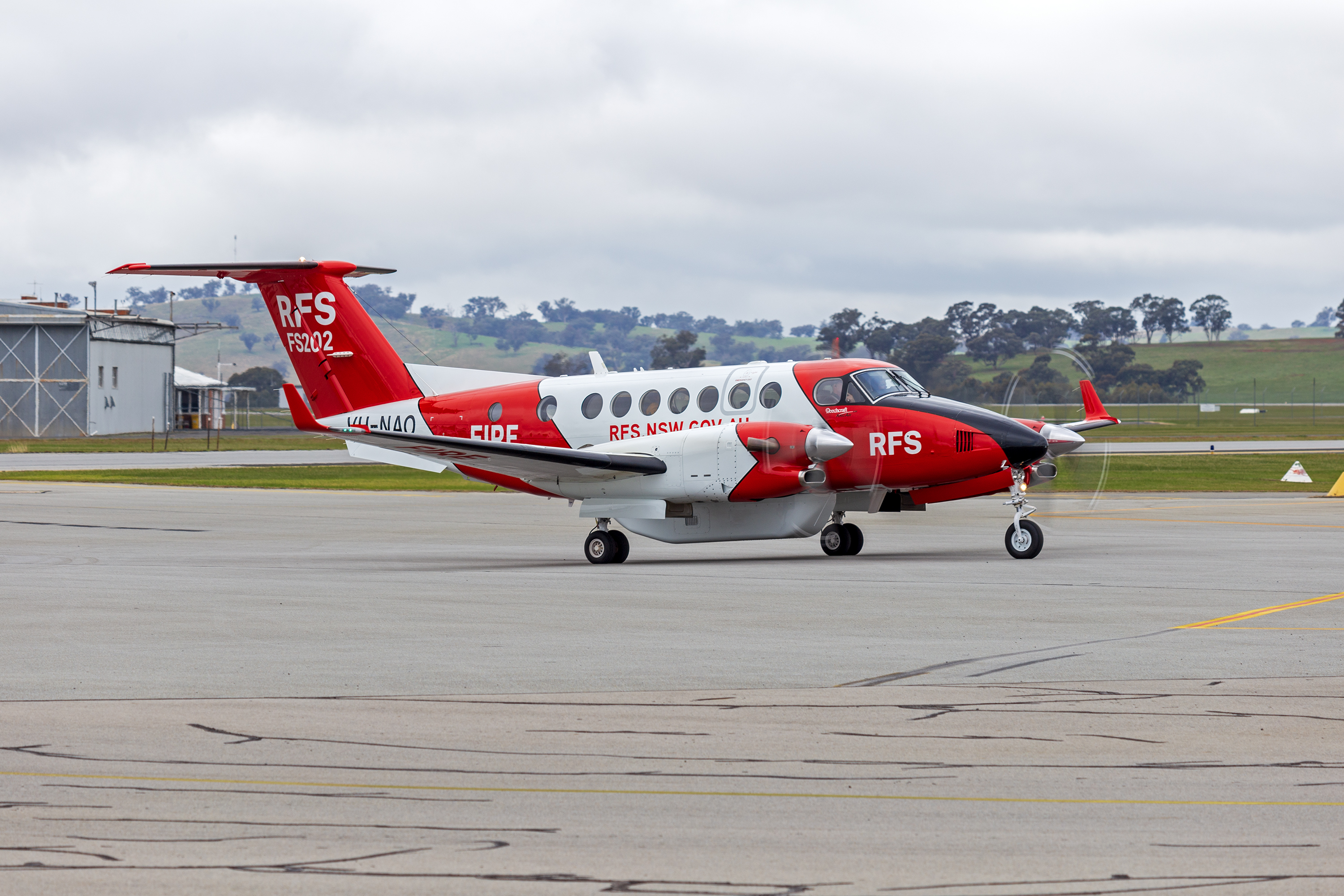
Beechcraft King Air 350CER (VH-NAO) Fire Scan 202

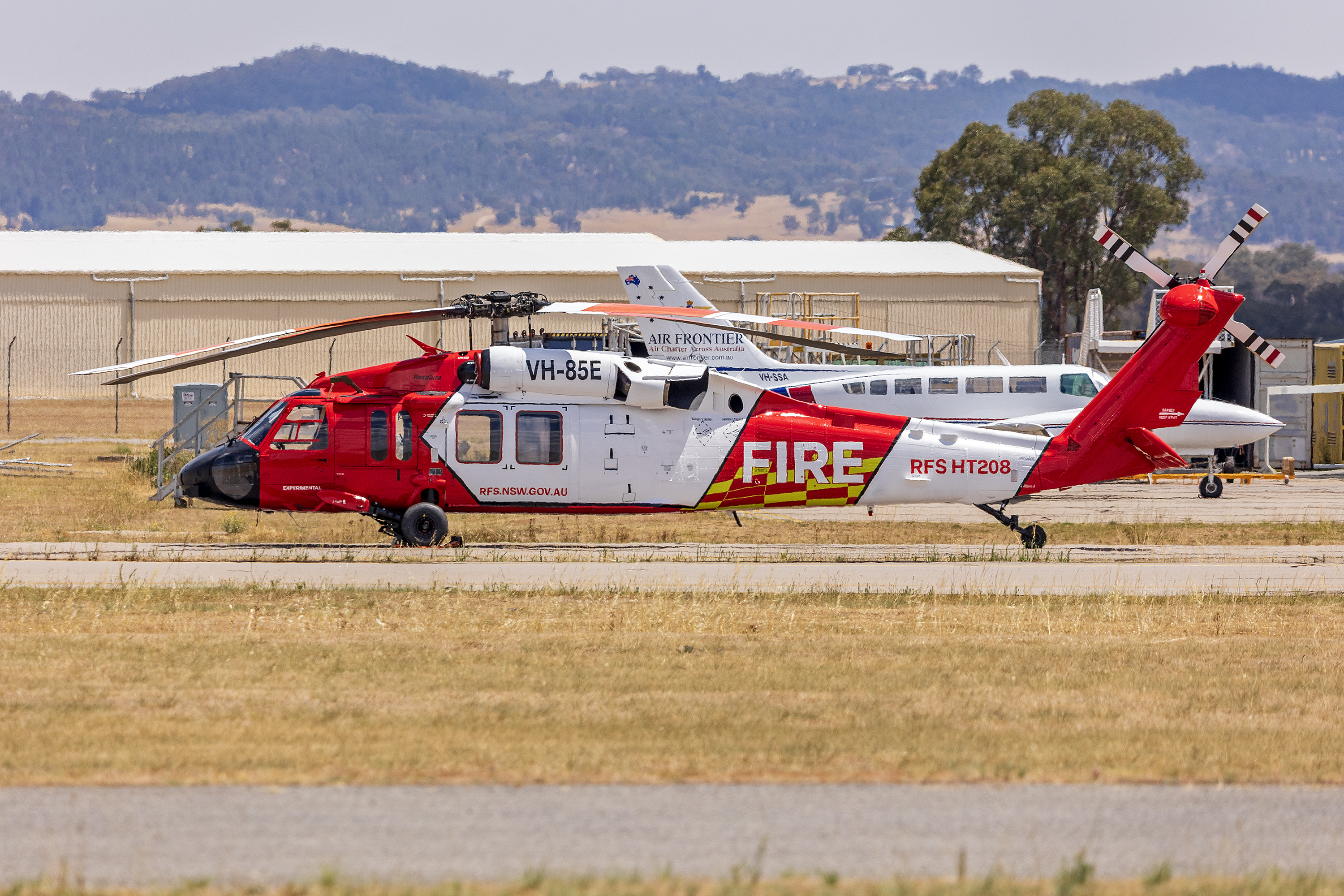
Sikorsky S-70A-9 Black Hawk (VH-85E) Helitak 208

=== Personal Protective Clothing/Equipment (PPC/E) ===
Each NSW Rural Fire Service member is issued and equipped with the latest safety equipment including RFS uniform and bush firefighting equipment. Extra equipment is provided when a member achieves additional qualifications including Breathing Apparatus Operator (BAO) Structural Firefighter (SFF), Crew/Group Leader (C/GL), aviation operations and most specialist qualifications.

== Capabilities ==
The NSW Rural Fire Service is the primary combat agency for bush fires. It also has the capability to assist other agencies with rescue operations.

Capability	Fire Rescue	RFS	SES	VRA	Police Rescue	Ambulance
Vehicle extrication	Yes	Yes	Yes	Yes	Yes	Yes
Community first responder	Yes	Yes	Yes	Yes	Yes	Lead
Flood/Swift water rescue	Yes	Yes	Lead	Yes	Yes	Yes
Storm and flood damage	Yes	Yes	Lead	Yes	No	No
Missing person search	Yes	Yes	Yes	Yes	Lead	Yes
Alpine rescue	Yes	No	Yes	Yes	Lead	Yes
Rope/Vertical rescue	Yes	No	Yes	Yes	Yes	Yes
Urban search and rescue	Lead	Yes	Yes	Yes	Yes	Yes
Animal rescue	Yes	Yes	Yes	Yes	Yes	Yes
Aircraft operations	No	Yes	Yes	Yes	Yes	Yes
Drone operations	Yes	Yes	Yes	Yes	Yes	Yes
Search and rescue dogs	Yes	No	No	Yes	Yes	No
Mounted search and rescue	No	No	No	Yes	Yes	No
Hazmat	Lead	No	No	No	No	No
Tsunami preparedness	No	No	Lead	No	No	No
Structure/Vehicle fires	Lead	Lead	No	No	No	No
Grass/Bush fires	Yes	Lead	No	No	No	No

== Representative Association ==
Both Volunteer and Salaried Members are represented and supported by the NSW Rural Fire Service Association (RFSA), which is recognised within the NSW Rural Fires Act 1997 as the official representative body. The NSW RFSA was established following both representatives of the now defunct Fire Control Officers Association (FCOA) and Volunteers coming together to establish a state wide organisation which could represent both Volunteers and Staff. Since establishment, the RFSA has been instrumental in putting in place a large consultative network and today have representation on both statutory and consultative committees at all levels of the RFS. The RFSA has a large number of assistance programs that support Volunteers and Staff as well as their families. These include:

- sponsorship
- scholarships
- welfare fund
- grant scheme
- young members group
- Chaplaincy, Counselling & Family support

== Recognition ==
Since its formation, the NSW Rural Fire Service and its personnel have been recognised in a variety of ways.

=== Internal Honours and Awards ===
==== Commissioner's Award for Valour ====
Since 2000, the following four firefighters have been awarded the Commissioner's Medal of Valour – the highest internal award – for "acts of conspicuous courage involving exceptional bravery under circumstances of great peril where there has been a clear and significant risk to life."

- 2000: Deputy Captain David Quinlivan (posthumously), for sacrificing his life to save his crew during the 1998 Wingello Fires.
- 2000: Michael Young for valour during the same incident.
- 2012: Captain Kendall Thompson, for the heli-rescue of 45 civilians during the 2010–2011 Queensland Floods.
- 2023: Deputy Group Captain Philip Blackmore, for saving the life of a man in a car explosion.

In addition to the Commissioner's Medal of Valor, Thompson was further awarded the Benjamin Franklin Fire Service Award for Valor, and awards from the Royal Life Saving Society Australia and the Royal Humane Society of Australasia.

==== Commissioner's Commendation for Bravery ====
Further to the Medal of Valor, the Commissioner's Commendation for Bravery recognises "an act of courage under hazardous circumstances where the risk to life has not been as significant as to warrant the Commissioner's Award for Valour but is worthy of recognition."

==== Commissioner's Commendation for Service ====
Similarly, the Commissioner's Commendation for Service recognises "service of a meritorious nature, or outstanding actions in relation to fire service duties, administrative leadership, or exemplary performance of a specific difficult project or task, not involving bravery."

=== Other Internal Awards ===
==== Young Volunteer of the Year (Age 12-15) ====
Awarded for the efforts of exceptional service and commitment to the RFS for a member aged 12-15.

==== Young Volunteer of the Year (Age 16-25) ====
Awarded for the efforts of exceptional service and commitment to the RFS for a member aged 16-25.

==== Secondary School Cadet Program Cadet of the Year ====
Recognises the efforts of a participant in the Secondary School Cadet Program and promotes learning, leadership and the values of volunteering and community service.

==== NSW Rural Fire Service Long Service Medal ====
Awarded for 10 years of Long Service to the RFS with impellers and clasps awarded for each subsequent 10 year period of service.

=== External Honours and Awards ===
==== National Honours System ====
In addition to internal honours and awards, personnel are additionally eligible for the Australian Fire Service Medal under the Australian honours and awards system.

==== NSW Premier's Bushfire Emergency Citation ====
Parallel to the Australian honours system, the Premier of New South Wales instituted the NSW Premier's Bushfire Emergency Citation for frontline service during the 2019–20 Australian bushfire season.

=== NSW Rural Fire Service Memorial – Dubbo ===
On 5 August 2022, a Memorial Garden at the State Training Academy in Dubbo dedicated to those NSW RFS members and contractors who died in the line of duty was unveiled.

The Memorial Garden design consists of two semi-circular memorial walls encompassing a bronze statue of a NSW RFS firefighter leaning on a rakehoe and a bronze propeller blade replica from Bomber 134 which crashed near Cooma in 2020. It lists the names of NSW RFS members and contractors who lost their lives in the line of duty.

The memorial was established under a partnership between the NSW Rural Fire Service Association and NSW Rural Fire Service who jointly funded the construction.

== See also ==
- Fire and Rescue NSW
- Country Fire Service (South Australia)
- Country Fire Authority (Victoria)
- NSW National Parks & Wildlife Service
- Section 44 (New South Wales)
- Remote Area Firefighting Team
- National Council for Fire & Emergency Services
