= RFSA =

RFSA may refer to one of the following:

- NSW Rural Fire Service Association, the representative body for the volunteers and staff of the New South Wales Rural Fire Service.
- Russian Federal Space Agency, a former name of Roscosmos, the state corporation of the Russian Federation responsible for space flights, cosmonautics programs, and aerospace research.
