= Section 44 =

Section 44 may refer to:

- Section 44 of the Constitution of Australia
- Section 44 Records, an independent record label
- Section 44 (New South Wales), a power of the Rural Fire Service
- Section 44 "stop and search" powers of the United Kingdom Terrorism Act 2000
- Section 44 of the Indian Penal Code, definition of "injury"
