= 2018 Tathra bushfire =

Bushfire in New South Wales, Australia

- Date: 18 – 19 March 2018
- Location: Tathra, South Coast, New South Wales, Australia
- Coordinates: 36°44′S 149°58′E

Statistics
- Burned area: 1,250 hectares (3,100 acres)
- Land use: Urban; Residential; Farmland; Forest reserves

Impacts
- Structures destroyed: As of 19 March: 69 houses; 30 caravans and cabins; 39 houses damaged

Ignition
- Cause: Electrical infrastructure failure (likely)

Map
- Location of the bushfire in New South Wales

The 2018 Tathra bushfire was a bushfire that burned between 18 and 19 March 2018 and primarily affected parts of the South Coast region in the Australian state of New South Wales. The fire, understood to have been caused by a failure in electrical infrastructure, began in the locality of Reedy Swamp, near Tarraganda, which spread east towards Tathra in the municipality of the Bega Valley Shire.

The fire burned through over 1,250 hectares (3,100 acres) of farmland and forest reserves, before impacting the village of Tathra. The fire burned into the town and resulted in an urban conflagration that destroyed over 100 structures.

== Background ==
Between July 2017 and February 2018 over 11,000 uncontrolled bushfires burnt 237,869 hectares (587,790 acres) across New South Wales; with major fires in the Sydney, Shoalhaven/Jervis Bay, Hunter, Mid Coast, Port Stephens, the Pilliga, Southern Tablelands, Mid Western and Tamworth/New England areas. December 2017 was the fifth-warmest December on record. In February 2018 the Minister for Emergency Services, Troy Grant, urged the public to help fire agencies by ensuring they remain prepared for fires. The day of the fire, 18 March 2018, was an extremely hot and windy day, with conditions reaching over 37 °C (99 °F) and winds gusting to over 70 kilometres per hour (43 mph) at the time the fire started.

== Timeline ==
March 18, 2018

- 11:15 - Fire near Tarraganda reported to local NSW Rural Fire Service by Tathra resident.
- 12:28 - First 000 call received, reporting bush fire in the Reedy Swamp area, near Tarraganda.
- 12:33 - Firefighting units are dispatched from the NSW Rural Fire Service, with offers of assistance from Fire and Rescue NSW declined.
- 12:38 - A large smoke column from the fire is highly visible throughout the Bega Valley area.
- 12:44 - The first Rural Fire Service unit arrives at the scene of the fire.
- 12:54 - Firefighters on scene report the fire is burning intensely and report Tathra as a possible future threat.
- 12:58 - The NSW Rural Fire Service decline a second offer of assistance from Fire and Rescue NSW with the fire rapidly escalating.
- 13:22 - The fire jumps Reedy Swamp Road and overruns firefighting units attempting to cut it off.
- 13:30 - At least 12 separate fires have started in the Bega Valley area.
- 14:56 - The fire jumps the Bega River and begins its run towards Tathra.
- 15:00 - At least 20 separate fires are burning in the Bega Valley area.
- 15:22 - Houses along Thompsons Drive, west of Tathra, begin to be impacted by fire.
- 15:34 - The fire begins impacting the main Tathra township.
- 15:56 - An urgent request is made by firefighters on the ground for any available unit to respond to Tathra.
- 16:16 - Crews on the ground report at least 35 houses are alight.
- 16:27 - The fire reaches the beach after burning through the township and stops at the ocean.
- 17:29 - At least 50 houses are reported to be alight.
- 22:40 - At least 1,000 hectares (2,500 acres) are believed to have been burnt, with the fire yet to be brought totally under control.

March 19, 2018

- Morning - Firefighters confirm the fire is under control, with at least 70 buildings destroyed and with more than 200 people seeking shelter in the Bega evacuation centre.
- Afternoon - Firefighters confirm 69 houses, 30 cabins/caravans as well as numerous other buildings have been destroyed, with a further 39 damaged and numerous people injured.

== Response ==
The NSW Premier, Gladys Berejiklian, Member for Bega, Andrew Constance, Member for Eden-Monaro, Mike Kelly and Prime Minister, Malcolm Turnbull, visited Tathra soon after the fire and met with evacuated people at the Bega Showgrounds.

On 26 March 2018 Berejiklian and Constance announced that up to $10 million was available to remove asbestos-contaminated material and to help residents to clean up their properties; with the clean-up operation coordinated by NSW Public Works in conjunction with insurers and the Bega Valley Shire Council. On 29 March Prime Minister Turnbull officially declared the Tathra and Reedy Swamp areas a disaster zone for the purposes of affected residents accessing Australian disaster relief funds. The NSW Government appointed Euan Ferguson AFSM as the official Recovery Coordinator and announced that impacted residents could access disaster relief grants to eligible individuals and families whose homes and essential household contents have been damaged or destroyed by a natural disaster; small business were provided access to free independent and confidential business advice; NSW Family and Community Services provided a range of temporary housing support options; and a range of other support services were provided. The Bega Valley Shire Council established a Mayoral Appeal Fund, under the chairmanship of Councillor Kristy McBain, the Mayor; over $1,500,000 has been raised to date.

== Investigations ==
Within hours of the fire commencing, numerous criticisms were raised by a small group of Fire and Rescue NSW firefighters through the Fire Brigade Employees Union in relation to the handling of the fire. Of immediate concern was that their assistance had been declined in the early stages of the fire, which they believe cost more houses which could have been saved. Further culminating the issue were claims by RFS Deputy Commissioner Rob Rogers that it would have been "dangerous" for Fire and Rescue NSW firefighters to attend the fire, as the terrain required four wheel drive vehicles and there were multiple fires along the Far South Coast. Following the allegations, further information was released detailing numerous incidents across the entire state where the Rural Fire Service had denied help from Fire and Rescue NSW at fires and other emergencies. As a result of this, the NSW Government instituted a commission of inquiry, headed by Mick Keelty AO, APM, a former Commissioner of the Australian Federal Police. The focus of the inquiry was on the call taking and dispatch arrangements of both Fire and Rescue NSW and the NSW Rural Fire Service. The NSW Rural Fire Service Association which represents the Volunteers and Staff undertook a comprehensive consultation process with its members and provided considerable information.

Both the Fire Brigade Employees Union and former Commissioner Keelty emphasised prior to and following the report, that it would not be a criticism of the action of volunteers, but rather an investigation into the overall co-ordination of emergency incidents in NSW. The inquiry identified numerous issues with the response to, and management of the fire. These included: the fact "some policies were not followed on the day"; a deputy incident controller was not appointed; there were delays in feeding information back to the FRNSW ComCen who were on the line to numerous 000 callers seeking assistance; the 'Fires Near Me' app was not regularly updated; an emergency alert was issued too late; ABC radio continued normal broadcasts on the day of the fires rather than broadcasting emergency updates; there were discrepancies in the number of resources attached to the fire between agencies; the RFS were limited to communications by radio with no real time vehicle locators; and that the 000 call taking system was "cumbersome" among other issues.

The key issue of the declined FRNSW assistance was addressed by Keelty in the report. Keelty stated that "It is likely that assistance from FRNSW was initially declined without full situational awareness of the intensity and speed of the fire" and that "FRNSW ComCen overruled the decision of the RFS District Duty Officer and deployed to the Bega Valley fires without being called out, but as it happened this was very useful for the overall protection of homes". Keelty made a number of recommendations, including the abolition of fire district boundaries between the two agencies, the establishment of an independent centralised 000 call taking system to replace the FRNSW call centre, the roll-out of automatic vehicle locators across the RFS fleet, a review of the effectiveness of emergency public information arrangements and that both services take steps to continue to building a strong mutual respect based relationship with one another, particularly in management areas.

Under the Coroner's Act 2009, the New South Wales Coroner instituted a coronial inquiry to establish the cause and origin of the bushfire.

The Coroners Inquiry was conducted by Deputy State Coroner Elaine Truscott across 17 days (3-7 August 2020, 10–14 August 2020, 17–21 August 2020, 10 and 12 November 2020) at the Coroner's Court of New South Wales in Sydney. Due to COVID-19 restrictions and the high level of public interest, all sessions were live streamed and recorded for playback.

The Deputy State Coroner handed down her findings on 17 December 2021. The findings which are covered in a 186-page report make a number of recommendations for the NSW Rural Fire Service, as well as Energy network operators Essential Energy and various vegetation management providers.

Two of the recommendations focused on improvements to Bega Fire Control Centre, including the need to preemptively stand up incident management teams at the Bega Fire Control Centre early. This highlighted the need to build a new Fire Control Centre in Bega which was announced in 2020.

== See also ==
- Bushfires in Australia
