= Remote Area Firefighting Team =

Remote Area Firefighting Team (RAFT) personnel are members of a number of Australian fire services, including the Queensland RURAL Fire Service, New South Wales Rural Fire Service, NSW National Parks and Wildlife Service and the ACT Rural Fire service who are particularly effective for work in rugged, isolated areas that firefighting tankers can't access by road. They can then be transported in 4WD before hiking to the fireground, or sometimes winched in by helicopter.

RAFTs are skilled in dry firefighting techniques such as creating firebreaks by cutting mineral earth trails or undertaking backburning work.

The winch training is just one aspect of the RAFT program which also includes a medical examination and fitness test to ensure crews can cope with this strenuous form of firefighting.

The ‘arduous pack test’ involves walking 4.83 km carrying 20.4 kg in 45 minutes or less to be eligible participate in training, or 43 minutes to be considered operationally deployable [2].

Because RAFT operate a long way from vehicle support, RAFT personnel rely on each other, so teams are made up of people with a good mix of training, good navigational skills, and the ability to carry heavy equipment over long distances.

The team must be self-supporting, carrying food, drinking water and basic camping equipment.

Decisions to deploy RAFT are only made after thorough risk assessment with detailed analysis of current and predicted fire behaviour. The safety of crew members is paramount.

== See also ==
- New South Wales
- Bushfires in Australia
- New South Wales Fire Brigades
- Firefighting
- Section 44 (New South Wales)
- Country Fire Service (South Australia)
- Country Fire Authority (Victoria)
