= Section 44 (New South Wales) =

Power of the Rural Fire Service to declare a local state of emergency

"Section 44" refers to the New South Wales Rural Fires Act 1997, specifically section 44, Commissioner’s responsibility. Essentially it is used to describe when the Rural Fire Service Commissioner declares a localised "State of Emergency" for a specific district suffering severe fire conditions that cannot be managed without drawing in extensive resources from other areas.

Once declared by the Commissioner the district has access to any and all fire-fighting personnel/equipment from across the State at no cost to the district or RFS, with the State Government footing the bill of all related Section 44 declared operations.

== See also ==
- Remote Area Firefighting Team
- Bushfires in Australia
- Fire Rescue New South Wales
- Country Fire Service (South Australia)
- Country Fire Authority (Victoria)
