= Australian Fire Service Medal =

- Obverse of medal and ribbon
- Type: Medal
- Awarded for: distinguished service
- Presented by: Governor-General of Australia
- Eligibility: members of an Australian Fire Service
- Post-nominals: AFSM
- Status: Currently awarded
- Established: 12 April 1988
- First award: 1989 Australia Day Honours

Highlights
- Total: 1,945

Order of Wear
- Next (higher): Australian Police Medal (APM)
- Next (lower): Ambulance Service Medal (ASM)

The Australian Fire Service Medal (AFSM) is awarded for distinguished service by a member of an Australian fire service. The AFSM was introduced in 1988, and replaced the Imperial awards of the Queen's Fire Service Medal for Gallantry and the Queen's Fire Service Medal for Distinguished Service. Recipients of the Australian Fire Service Medal are entitled to use the post-nominal letters "AFSM".

Awards are made by the Governor-General, on the nomination of the responsible federal, state or territory minister. The total number of awards each year must not exceed the following quota:

- one award for each 1,000, or part of 1,000, full-time permanent members of the combined fire services of each state;
- one award for each 5,000, or part of 5,000, part-time, volunteer or auxiliary members of the combined fire services of each state; and one additional award in each state;
- one award of the Medal shall be made in each calendar year in respect of the combined fire services in each of the Australian Capital Territory and the Northern Territory of Australia;
- one award of the Medal shall be made in each calendar year in respect of a Commonwealth fire service; and
- an occasional award (not exceeding one per calendar year) may be made in respect of the fire service of an External Territory as determined by the responsible Minister.

== Description ==
- The AFSM is a circular copper-nickel medal. It is ensigned with the Crown of St Edward. The obverse displays an image of The Queen superimposed over a seven-pointed star of flames.
- The reverse is inscribed with the words ‘Australian Fire Service Medal’, and ‘For Distinguished Service’ on a background of flames.
- The 32 millimetre-wide ribbon has a central vertical band of gold, which is superimposed with a red pattern symbolising flames. The two outer vertical bands are green.

== See also ==
Australian Honours Order of Precedence
