= NSW Rural Fire Service Association =

Rural Fire Service Association

Rural Fire Service Association.
- New South Wales Rural Fire Service Association Incorporated
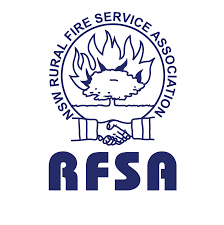
- Founded: 1996
- Headquarters: Penrith, NSW
- Location: Australia
- Members: 70,000 (approx.)
- Key people: Scott Campbell (President), Sharon Ellicot (CEO)
- Website: Official website

The NSW Rural Fire Service Association (RFSA) is the official representative body for the volunteers and staff of the New South Wales Rural Fire Service, which is the World's largest volunteer firefighting organisation.

== RFSA history and objectives ==
The Association was established from the Fire Control Officers Association (FCOA) that represented the views of the Fire Control Officers employed by Local Government Councils to the NSW Department of Bushfire Services. In 1996 a group of these Officers and a number of volunteers met to discuss the establishment of a state wide organisation which would represent all members of the Service, both salaried and volunteers. It was from these discussions that it was determined to disband the FCOA and to establish the RFSA as the peak representative body.

The objectives of the NSW Rural Fire Service Association Inc (RFSA) are to:

- Provide a forum to consolidate and represent the views of all members of the RFS
- Ensure the views of the members are taken into account in the decision making processes of the RFS
- Act as a focal point assisting in the development of the RFS
- Provide tangible benefits to all members of the Association

The RFSA is a bipartisan organisation and seeks consensus among all stakeholders of the RFS. It is not a union; the RFSA constitution prohibits involvement in activities that relate to industrial negotiations for RFS employees.

== RFSA Board of Directors ==
The RFSA’s State Board oversees the day-to-day running of the Association. It reviews and approves strategies and action plans for the continuing development of the Association. The State Board comprises both volunteer and staff members of the Rural Fire Service in NSW, bringing together an appropriate mix of skills and experience to address the affairs of the RFSA.

=== Directors ===
- Scott Campbell – President
- Steve Robinson – Vice President
- Vikki Bingley – Secretary
- Brian Millar – Treasurer
- Troy Dowley – Director
- Jason Lewington – Director
- Leah Ross – Director
- Glenda Howell – Director
- David Stimson – Director
- Glenn Wall – Director

== RFSA Structure ==
The RFSA has 17 Divisions across New South Wales which each have a Chair and Delegate who collectively form the State Council. The divisions are made up of several Branches aligned to the Rural Fire Districts within them.

=== Branches ===
Delegates are appointed by each Rural Fire Brigade. The Branch executives include Chairperson, Secretary, Delegates to the Division and Alternate Delegates to the Division.

=== Divisions ===
The Division executives include Chairperson, Secretary, 1 x Delegate to the State Council and Alternate Delegates to the State Council.

=== State Council ===
The State Council is the RFSA’s governing body with a Chairperson and Delegate from each of 17 RFSA Divisions. Each Division correlates to NSW Rural Fire Service’s Districts/Teams/Zones, ensuring comprehensive state-wide representation. The State Council are responsible for electing the 10 person board of Directors every two years.

== Representation and advocacy ==
The RFSA is formally recognised within the Rural Fires Act 1997 as the representative body for members of the New South Wales Rural Fire Service. In order to represent members, the RFSA has seats on all Statutory and Consultative Committees which relate to the Rural Fire Service.

As a non-partisan body the RFSA has a long history of building strong working relationships with all sides of Government and its strong position has led to various major changes in Legislation and Government funding.

One such outcome was the introduction of the presumptive legislation for firefighters, amending the Workers Compensation legislation to take the burden of proof off NSW firefighters who are diagnosed with one of 12 prescribed cancers and meet the applicable minimum employment periods. The legislation was passed by the NSW Parliament in 2018, with the support of RFSA alongside other stakeholders.

Another outcome was a new ‘slow down to 40km/h rule’, which was adopted by the NSW Government in September 2018 under a 12-month trial, and permanently implemented in September 2019, with some amendments stemming from input from RFSA and other stakeholders.

== Support ==
=== Sponsorship ===
The RFSA provides opportunities for Members to gain skills and knowledge are supported by the RFSA by ongoing sponsorship of NSW RFS programs, including:

- State Championships
- Regional and District exercises
- Young Members Group
- The Australian Fire Cadet Championships.

=== RFSA Welfare Fund ===
Another RFSA initiative is the creation and funding of the RFSA Welfare Fund, which provides assistance for members in times of need.

=== Scholarships ===
The RFSA provides annual scholarships to enhance the knowledge, skills and personal development of our members so they can best serve the community and achieve their individual goals.<ref.

The annual scholarships are available to both NSW RFS volunteers and staff.

=== Grant Scheme ===
A key objective of the RFSA is to distribute a high percentage of proceeds generated from their funding programs as grants to NSW RFS volunteer brigades and support groups to improve the level of equipment, training and welfare of their members; and provide an overall community benefit.

All NSW RFS Brigades and Districts can apply for a Grant individually or collectively and since the inception of the grants scheme the RFSA has distributed millions of dollars in grants.

=== NSW RFS Young Members Group ===
The RFSA is the primary sponsor of the NSW RFS Young Members Group (YMG) which is a group of ten elected young volunteer members between the ages of 18–25 years.

The primary purpose of the Young Members Group is to advise the Membership Services Consultative Committee as well as other areas of the NSW RFS as appropriate. Primary roles of the YMG include providing advice on NSW RFS Service Standards open for comment that affect young members through existing Policy and Service Standard feedback processes, promoting and providing advice on issues affecting young members; assisting in developing strategies that might enhance the experience of young people in the NSW RFS; providing advice on recruitment and retention strategies relating to young people; raising the profile of young members within the NSW RFS and assisting in developing communication strategies for young members.

=== Chaplaincy, Counselling & Family Support ===
The RFSA is committed to providing member welfare for those in need of assistance or who are experiencing hardship. They have a broad range of measures in place, supporting the work of the NSW RFS Chaplains and Critical Incident Support Services who provide care for volunteers, staff and their families.

The Associations welfare fund assists injured firefighters, as well as those who have suffered loss or damage to their homes, farms and livestock.

=== NSW Rural Fire Service Memorial – Dubbo ===
On 5 August 2022, a Memorial Garden at the State Training Academy in Dubbo dedicated to those NSW RFS members and contractors who died in the line of duty was unveiled.

The Memorial Garden design consists of two semi-circular memorial walls encompassing a bronze statue of a NSW RFS firefighter leaning on a rakehoe and a bronze propeller blade replica from Bomber 134 which crashed near Cooma in 2020. It lists the names of NSW RFS members and contractors who lost their lives in the line of duty.

The memorial was established under a partnership between the Association and the New South Wales Rural Fire Service who jointly funded the construction.

== Fundraising ==
The RFSA is classified as a large not-for-profit charity and registered with the Australian Charities and Not-for-profits Commission (ACNC). In 2012, the Association established a not-for-profit company NSW RFSA to fund the objectives and activities of the association. The association is funded largely through the operation of fundraising raffles to the public of NSW. It also relies upon donations and their RFSA Welfare Fund is registered with the Australian Taxation Office as a Deductible Gift Recipient organisation which allows supporters to make tax deductible donations over $2.

Various corporations have supported the work of the RFSA including LEGO who in 2020 donated thousands of LEGO kits for the Association to provide to volunteers families whilst at the same time Gerni donated a large number of wet and dry vacuum cleaners for distribution to brigades.

In 2021 the RFSA established a clothing and lifestyle product brand known as Spirit Of Us which produces and sells a range of Australian made latest style casual clothing and headwear. The range has received public endorsement by well known celebrities including actor and director Sam Neill and Australian music legend Diesel.
